= Cotuit Kettleers =

Collegiate summer baseball team in Massachusetts

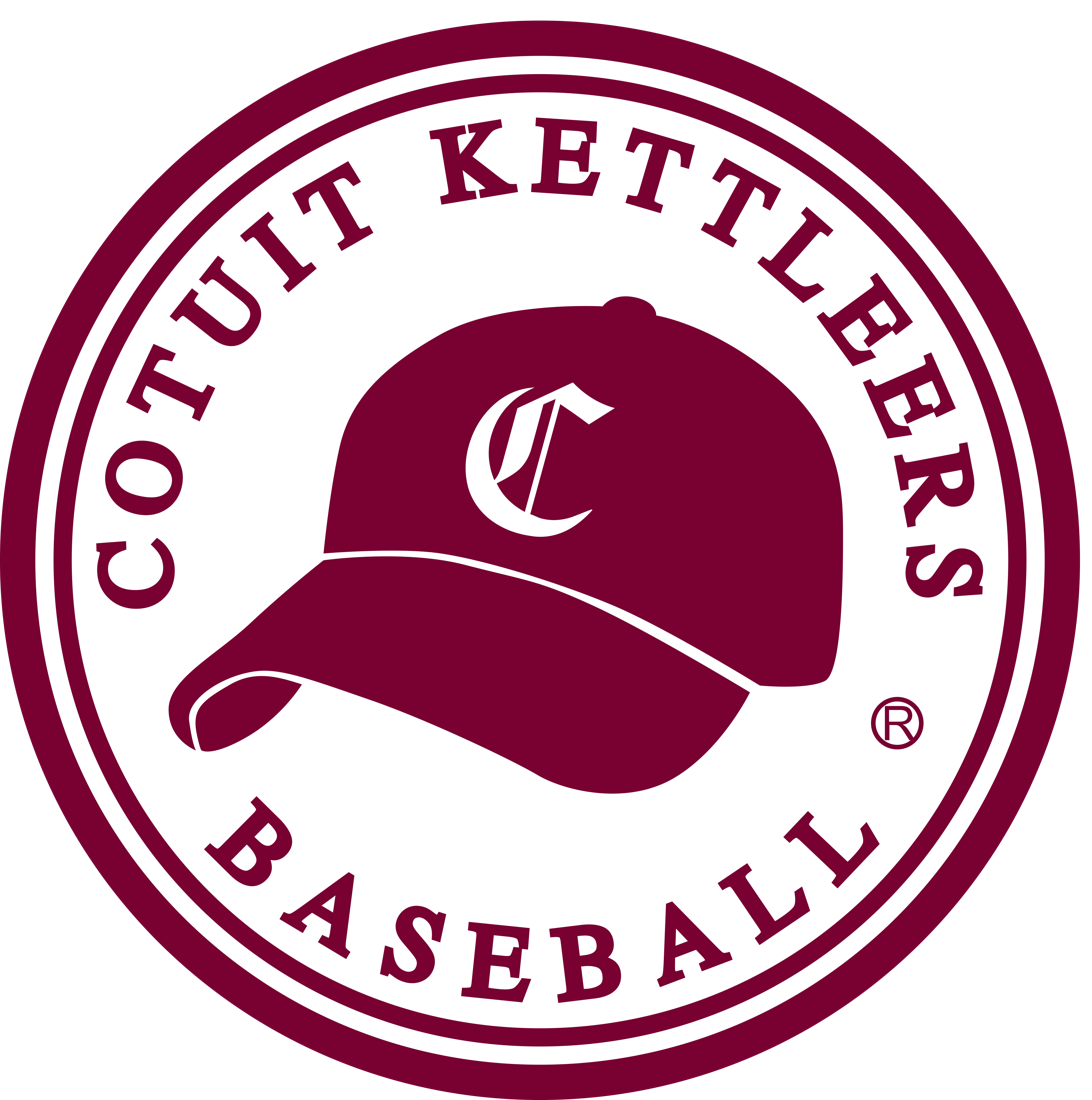
- Logo

Information
- League: Cape Cod Baseball League (West Division)
- Location: Cotuit, Massachusetts
- Ballpark: Lowell Park
- Founded: 1947
- League championships: 1961, 1962, 1963, 1964, 1972, 1973, 1974, 1975, 1977, 1981, 1984, 1985, 1995, 1999, 2010, 2013, 2019
- Ownership: Cotuit Athletic Association
- President: Terry Moran
- General manager: Bruce Murphy
- Manager: Rob Cooper
- Website: www.capecodleague.com/cotuit/

The Cotuit Kettleers are a collegiate summer baseball team based in the village of Cotuit, Massachusetts, which is in the southwest corner of the town of Barnstable. The team is a member of the Cape Cod Baseball League (CCBL) and plays in the league's West Division. The Kettleers play their home games at Lowell Park in Cotuit. The team has been owned and operated by the non-profit Cotuit Athletic Association since 1947, and over 100 players have gone on to play in Major League Baseball.

The Kettleers most recently won the CCBL championship in 2019 when they defeated the Harwich Mariners two games to none to win the best of three championship series. The title was the team's seventeenth overall, including two separate strings of four consecutive titles (1961–64 and 1972–75). Cotuit's record of fifteen titles in the modern era (1963–present) and seventeen overall is unmatched among CCBL franchises.

== History ==
=== Pre-modern era ===
==== Origins of baseball in Cotuit ====
Baseball in the village of Cotuit dates back to the early days of the sport on Cape Cod. The Cotuit team split a home-and-home series with a team from Osterville in 1883, and defeated West Barnstable in a July 4 baseball game in 1888. Cotuit took both ends of a July 4 doubleheader against Falmouth in 1904, and repeated the feat in 1905, sweeping Falmouth in another holiday twin bill. It was reported of Cotuit's 1905 team that, "the people of the village and the summer guests in town are well pleased with the various games played here this season," and that team manager David Goodspeed "has been able to give to the public an interesting series of games."

==== The early Cape League era (1923–1939) ====
In 1923, the Cape Cod Baseball League was formed and originally included Falmouth, Chatham, and two teams representing villages from the town of Barnstable: Osterville and Hyannis. After the 1930 season, Osterville and Hyannis merged to form a single "Barnstable" town team. In addition to being represented in the CCBL by this town team, the village of Cotuit also fielded its own team in the Upper Cape Twilight League.

==== The Upper and Lower Cape League era (1946–1962) ====
The Cape Cod Baseball League was revived in 1946 after taking a hiatus during World War II, and was originally composed of 11 teams across Upper Cape and Lower Cape divisions. Barnstable's entry in the 1946 Lower Cape Division played at the Barnstable High School field in Hyannis. The following season, the Barnstable team moved to the Upper Cape Division, where it competed against a newly-formed second Barnstable team from the village of Cotuit.

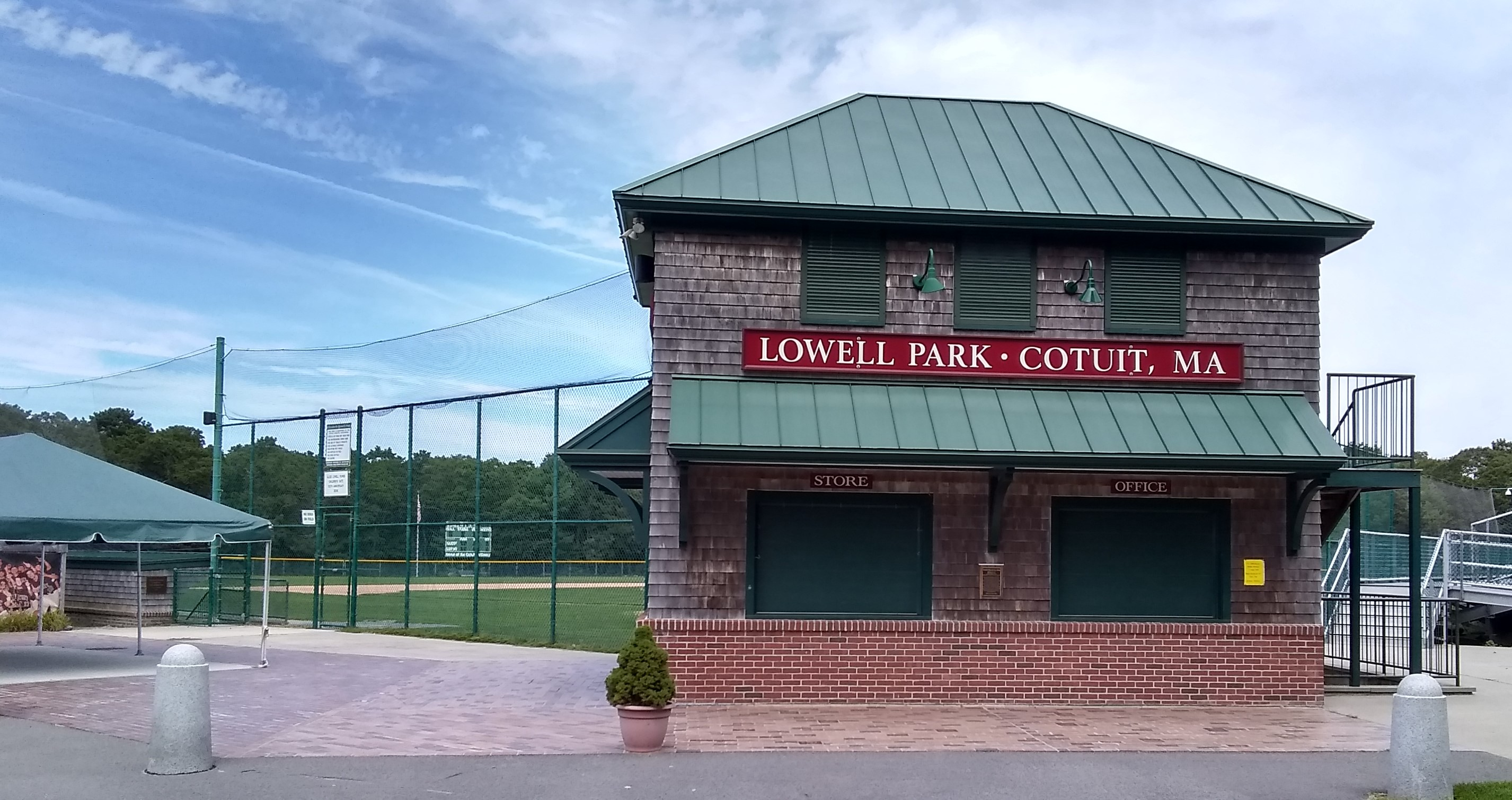
Lowell Park has been home of the Kettleers since the 1940s.

The Cotuit Athletic Association was formed in 1947 with the primary objective of sponsoring the village's new Cape League franchise. The team played at Lowell Park, and soon came to be known as the "Kettleers", a nickname credited to Cape Cod Standard-Times sports editor Ed Semprini, who used the moniker in his coverage of the Cotuit team. The term recalls a legendary local land transaction between early area settlers and Native Americans, the terms of sale involving the exchange of a brass kettle. The inaugural 1947 team featured first baseman Manny Robello and his twin brother, player-manager Victor Robello. Manny went on to serve for many years as president of the Cotuit Athletic Association, and was known as the "original Kettleer". At his passing in 1986, the league established an annual 10th Player Award named in his honor.

CCBL Hall of Famer Arnold Mycock joined the organization in 1949, and became the team's general manager the following year, a post he held until 1995. Mycock's organizational skills, energy and vision were instrumental not only in making Cotuit a model franchise, but also as "the singular driving force behind the Cape League’s success." Cotuit got its first taste of postseason action in 1949. The team was led by CCBL Hall of Famer Jim Perkins, a burly slugger who led the league with a .432 batting average and 12 homers, and was featured in Ripley's Believe It or Not! for his feat that season of belting two grand slams in a single inning. Cotuit finished atop the Upper Cape Division standings for the 1949 season's second half, but was downed by first half champ Falmouth in the Upper Cape finals. The Kettleers reached the Upper Cape playoff finals again in 1950, 1951 and 1954, but in each season the powerful Sagamore Clouters prevented Cotuit from advancing to the Cape League finals.

The 1955 Kettleers featured the big bat of Jim Perkins and the mound work of fellow CCBL Hall of Famer Cal Burlingame, considered by many to be the best Cape League player of the era. Facing old nemesis Sagamore in the Upper Cape playoff finals, Cotuit finally broke through to claim the Upper Cape crown and advance to the Cape League title series, where the Kettleers were shut down by perennial Lower Cape powerhouse Orleans.

Perkins was the team's player-manager in the 1956 and 1957 seasons. Burlingame left to pitch for Barnstable in 1956, but returned to Cotuit in 1957 and 1958. CCBL Hall of Fame fireballer Donald Hicks joined the Kettleers in 1956. Hicks was the star of the 1948 CCBL champion Mashpee Warriors, and had been Upper Cape league MVP for Mashpee in 1950. After the Mashpee team dissolved following the 1955 season, Hicks joined Cotuit and played for the Kettleers through 1960. CCBL Hall of Famer Jim Hubbard joined the Kettleers in 1959 after winning a CCBL title with Yarmouth the prior season. Hubbard played for Cotuit for three seasons, serving as player-manager in 1961, and then as full-time manager throughout the rest of the 1960s.

Hubbard's 1961 Kettleers featured a pair of CCBL Hall of Fame southpaws: Bob Butkus, a 17-year-old from Boston Latin School posted a 4–1 record with a 1.75 ERA, and Boston College's Bernie Kilroy, who had joined Cotuit the previous season and been named Upper Cape league MVP. Both became perennial CCBL all-stars throughout the 1960s. The '61 team also featured all-star hurler Dick Mayo and fellow all-star Tony Capo, a left fielder from Holy Cross. Cotuit finished the regular season with a dominating 24–4 record, and dropped Barnstable in the first round of the Upper Cape playoffs. In the Upper Cape finals, the Kettleers swept Falmouth in two straight, with Mayo tossing a one-hit shutout in the Game 2 clincher. In the Cape League title series, Cotuit was matched up against the Lower Cape champion Yarmouth Indians, who had won CCBL crowns in two of the previous three seasons. Mayo one-hit the Indians in Game 1, but it wasn't enough as the Kettleers took a tight 3–2 loss at home. Cotuit bounced back in Game 2 with a 5–0 Kilroy shutout at Yarmouth. The Kettleers sent Butkus to the mound for the pivotal Game 3 at Lowell Park, and the home team came away with a 7–2 win, clinching Cotuit's first CCBL championship.

The 1962 Cotuit club returned outfielder Capo and hurlers Kilroy, Butkus and Mayo, and added CCBL Hall of Fame catcher Jack McCarthy. McCarthy, like Butkus the previous season, joined the team as a 17-year-old Boston Latin School student. The '62 Kettleers boasted ten batters with season averages over the .300 mark, including McCarthy, Capo and Mayo, as well as the infield quartet of Jeff Helzel (1B), Bill Prizio (2B), Paul Morano (SS) and Stan Sikorsky (3B). The team finished another dominant regular season with a record of 25–5, and met Bourne in the first round of the Upper Cape playoffs. Butkus tossed a two-hitter for the 2–1 Game 1 win, and the Kettleers finished the Bourne sweep in Game 2 with a 5–1 Kilroy three-hitter powered by longballs off the bats of Helzel and McCarthy. Cotuit managed another sweep in the Upper Cape finals, disposing of Sagamore in two straight, including a 15–4 Game 1 pasting of the Clouters. The Cape League championship series against Harwich was played as a Labor Day doubleheader. In Game 1, the Kettleers dished out a 14–0 clubbing at Lowell Park, with Butkus tossing the two-hit shutout. Kilroy was almost as good in Game 2 on the road, allowing only four Harwich hits. Helzel's three-run homer was all Kilroy needed in a 3–0 victory that secured Cotuit's second consecutive Cape League title.

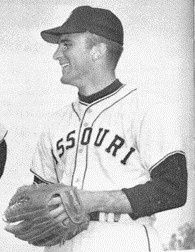
Keith Weber won a CCBL title with Cotuit in 1964, and pitched for the US at the Tokyo Olympics later that summer.

=== Modern era (1963–present) ===
In 1963, the CCBL was reorganized and became officially sanctioned by the NCAA. The league would no longer be characterized by "town teams" who fielded mainly Cape Cod residents, but would now be a formal collegiate league. Teams began to recruit college players and coaches from an increasingly wide geographic radius. The league was originally composed of ten teams, which were divided into Upper Cape and Lower Cape divisions. The Kettleers joined Wareham, Falmouth, Bourne and Sagamore in the Upper Cape Division.

==== The 1960s and Hubbard's "four-peat" ====
In 1963, the Kettleers continued to ride their success into the newly-reorganized league, returning many of the same faces, including McCarthy, Kilroy, Mayo, Helzel, Sikorsky, and Butkus, who was the league's Outstanding Pitcher with a minuscule 1.04 ERA. All-American basketballer Cotton Nash of Adolph Rupp's Kentucky Wildcats joined the Kettleers as a pitcher/outfielder. Cotuit finished the regular season with a 28–4 record and first-place finish in the Upper Cape Division, and earned a bye in the first round of playoffs. The Kettleers met Wareham in the Upper Cape finals, but dropped Game 1, 1–0, for the hard-luck loser Butkus, who had tossed a two-hitter. Cotuit bounced back to take Game 2 by a 3–1 tally, and Butkus got his revenge in Game 3 as he pitched the Kets to a 5–2 series-clinching win. Game 1 of the Cape League championship series against Orleans was the Bernie Kilroy show. Kilroy did the mound work and also drove in three runs on three hits to help his own cause in Cotuit's 5–4 win at Lowell Park. Game 2 at Eldredge Park saw the Kettleers bang out a 7–1 victory on five hits and 14 walks to give Hubbard's crew their third consecutive Cape League crown.

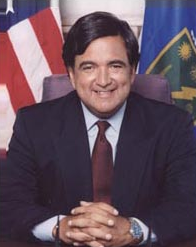
Ambassador Bill Richardson pitched for the Kettleers in 1967.

Hubbard's 1964 squad returned McCarthy, Butkus and Kilroy, who was the league's Outstanding Pitcher with a 1.44 ERA and 72 strikeouts with only 16 walks in 62.1 innings. To this championship core, the Kettleers added outfielder/pitcher and league MVP Ken Huebner, as well as 1964 All-American hurler Keith Weber, who pitched later that summer for the United States at the 1964 Summer Olympics in Tokyo, Japan. The Kettleers finished the regular season with an astonishing 31–3 record, and faced the Lower Cape Division champion Chatham in the CCBL title series. Cotuit sent Weber to the mound at home for Game 1, and came away with a 4–0 shutout. Weber allowed only three hits in the win, and the Kettleers got a pair of RBI's each from McCarthy and Huebner. In Game 2 at Veterans Field, Kilroy took the hill and Butkus came on in relief in a 6–3 Kettleers' win that gave Cotuit an unprecedented fourth consecutive league championship.

After the '64 title, Hubbard continued to skipper the Kettleers throughout the 1960s, but the team finished no better than second place, and did not return again to the championship series in the decade. The trio of Butkus, Kilroy and McCarthy was together for one last season in 1965, and Kilroy continued to twirl for Cotuit through 1967. CCBL Hall of Famer Bob Hansen starred for the Kettleers from 1966 to 1968, an all-star first baseman/outfielder, he was voted to the CCBL's 1960's all-decade team, and went on to play in parts of two seasons with the Milwaukee Brewers. The 1967 Kettleers pitching staff included Jim Courier and Doug Smith, both of whom tossed no-hitters for Cotuit, as well as Bill Richardson, who went on to become the Governor of New Mexico and the United States Ambassador to the United Nations.

==== The 1970s and McCarthy's "four-peat" ====
Longtime Kettleer star Jack McCarthy succeeded Hubbard as skipper in 1970. The Kettleers qualified for postseason play in eight of nine years under McCarthy's leadership, and claimed the CCBL crown five times. The 1971 club featured a trio of star moundsmen in Rick Burley, who won seven with four shutouts and tossed a no-hitter, University of Rhode Island star Brian Sheekey, who struck out 96 in 96 innings, and Don Douglas, who won nine games and posted a 1.70 ERA in 90 innings.

McCarthy's 1972 squad finished the regular season in a three-way tie for first place with Falmouth and Orleans. The team featured Florida State University's Tim Sherrill, who batted .354, Rice University slugger Joe Zylka, who bashed 14 long-balls on the season, and ace hurler Ken Schultz, who won eight games for Cotuit, striking out 89 in 86 innings. The Kettleers took the semi-final series against Falmouth, two games to one, and met fourth-place upset winner Chatham in the best-of-five Cape League title series. Cotuit came away with a three games to one series victory over the A's, winning the Game 4 finale 5–4 on two homers by Sherrill and another by Rick Burley.

The 1973 Kettleers returned the power-hitting Zylka, and also featured future major leaguers Jack Kucek and Danny Goodwin, a CCBL all-star who tied the Cotuit team record with six triples. The team finished the regular season in second place and swept Wareham in the playoff semi-finals, getting wins from Ken Herbst and lefty Rob Klass. The Kettleers faced Yarmouth in the best-of-five CCBL title series, and took Game 1 with Kucek on the mound, 6–2. Game 2 at Yarmouth was tied 6–6 after 11 innings and had to be called. The Red Sox took the following game to knot the series, but Cotuit took the next two to claim the crown.

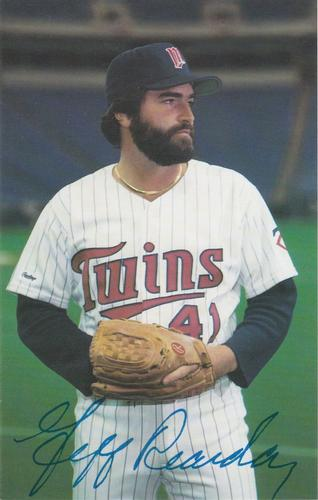
CCBL Hall of Famer Jeff Reardon pitched for the 1974 and 1975 champion Kettleers.

Plagued by injuries, the 1974 Kettleers eked into the playoffs as a fourth-place team with a record just above the .500 mark. The team featured two CCBL Hall of Famers in Boston College third baseman Paul O'Neill and pitcher Jeff Reardon, who went on to amass 367 big league saves. The team also featured Stanford University's Bob Hampton, who clouted 10 homers, Harvard University hurler Don Driscoll, and pitcher Ken Herbst, who returned from the '73 title team. Facing first place Wareham in the semifinal playoffs, the Kettleers dropped Game 1, 5–0, and seemed primed for an early exit. But Cotuit bounced back at home with Reardon on the mound, winning 6–2. In the Game 3 series finale at Clem Spillane Field, Driscoll tossed a six-hitter and the Kettleers prevailed in a tight 3–2 contest, moving on to face Orleans in the best-of-five title tilt. Cotuit took Game 1 of the finals at Orleans, 6–2, but the Cardinals stormed back to take Games 2 and 3. The Kettleers got back on track in Game 4 at Lowell Park, as Driscoll spun a two-hitter, and the Kets walked off an exciting 3–2 win in the ninth as O'Neill came home from second on a bunt single and throwing error. Prior to Game 5, an emergency call went out to Herbst, who had left the team several days earlier to return to the University of Minnesota. McCarthy had run out of pitchers, so Herbst was flown back to take the mound for the Game 5 finale at Eldredge Park. With the score tied at 1–1 going into the bottom of the seventh, Orleans put a man on second with two outs. The next batter hit a grounder and Herbst, covering first, dropped the throw, then threw home too high to get the runner. Cotuit tied it in the top of the eighth, and Herbst found his redemption at the plate in the ninth. With one out, he bashed a triple, then came home with two out on a ball through the second baseman's glove. In a most improbable season, an improbable hero had earned Cotuit its third consecutive league title.

In 1975, the Kettleers returned Reardon and O'Neill, who led the league with a .358 batting average and was named league MVP. McCarthy's club also featured future major league hurler Joe Beckwith, and faced Orleans in the playoff semi-finals. In Game 1, Beckwith went the distance, and Boston College's Al Bassignani provided the clout with two homers and five RBI's to go with his ninth-inning home run robbery of a Roger LaFrancois drive with two men on, as the Kettleers took the opener, 7–1. Reardon got the start in Game 2, and Cotuit came away with a 5–2 win to sweep the series. The best-of-five Cape League finals matched Cotuit against the Falmouth Commodores, and the Kettleers seemed to be rolling along, taking both Games 1 and 2. The Commodores responded by taking the next two to even the series and send it to a decisive Game 5 at Falmouth. The Kettleers grabbed the crown with a 14–3 romp that featured six Cotuit homers, including two by O'Neill and a grand slam by Barry Butera. With a fourth consecutive CCBL title, McCarthy's Kettleers had matched Hubbard's feat of the prior decade, and brought Cotuit its eighth championship overall.

The Kettleers' streak was stopped in 1976 by a talented Wareham team that bounced Cotuit in the playoff semifinals and went on to take the league title. McCarthy's boys rebounded quickly, finishing in first place in 1977 with a team that starred CCBL Hall of Famer Del Bender, an all-league left fielder who led the CCBL with a .395 batting average and set a modern-era league record with 64 hits. The team also featured the league's Outstanding Pro Prospect in ace hurler Brian Denman, second baseman and future major leaguer Gary Redus, and slugger Joe Rietano, who crushed 14 homers on the season. The Kettleers faced Wareham in the playoff semi-finals, and took Game 1, 11–8, getting two homers by Bender and a three-run shot by Redus. Cotuit completed the sweep in Game 2 as Redus stole three bags and scored three runs in the Kettleers' 12–1 shellacking of the Gatemen. The best-of-five championship series matched the Kettleers with the Yarmouth-Dennis Red Sox. Game 1 seemed to portend a lopsided series, as the Kettleers ran roughshod over the Red Sox, banging five homers and getting five RBI's from Bender in a 19–3 rout. The Cotuit bats exploded again for a 15–11 win in Game 2, knocking Y-D for 24 hits in a slugfest that featured three homers by Y-D's league MVP Steve Balboni. The Red Sox battled back to even the series, however, taking Game 3, 10–1, and Game 4, 5–4. In the decisive Game 5 at Lowell Park, the Kettleers found themselves down 3–0 in the third, but starter Kevin Waldrop allowed just two more Y-D hits over the final six innings, and the Kettleers scratched their way to an 8–3 win to claim the league crown. The title was the fifth in six years for McCarthy's club.

CCBL Hall of Famer George Greer, who had been a player for Chatham in the 1960s, took the Kettleer helm in 1979. He skippered the club for nine seasons, qualifying for postseason play in all nine campaigns, and winning three league titles. In Greer's first season, the Kettleers starred CCBL Hall of Fame second baseman and future major leaguer Tim Teufel, who hit .351 and set league records with 16 homers and 52 RBI's.

==== The 1980s bring three more titles in the Greer era ====
Greer's 1980 club featured CCBL Hall of Famer Ron Darling, who batted .336 with six home runs while posting a 4–3 mark on the mound, and was named the league's MVP and Outstanding Pro Prospect. At the CCBL All-Star Game at Yankee Stadium, he singled, doubled and homered as the CCBL left fielder, then came on in the final inning to pitch in relief, preserving the CCBL's one-run victory over the Atlantic Collegiate Baseball League.

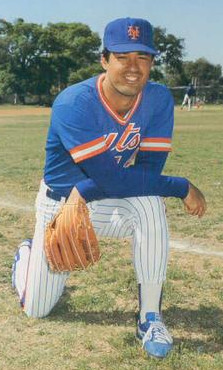
Ron Darling was league MVP and Outstanding Pro Prospect for Cotuit in 1980.

In 1981, the Kettleers starred CCBL Hall of Famer Jeff Innis, who led the league with a 2.34 ERA and eight saves. The team finished the regular season in fourth place with a mediocre record, but upset first place Wareham in the playoff semifinals. After splitting the first two games of the series, Cotuit took the decisive Game 3 on a masterful three-hitter by Doug Swearingen. In the best-of-five Cape League finals against Orleans, the Kettleers dropped Game 1 at Eldredge Park, but came back to take a tight Game 2, 9–8 in 10 innings. Cotuit sent Swearingen to the mound for Game 3, and jumped out early, taking a 3–0 lead after only four Orleans pitches. The Kettleers walloped four homers, two of them by Billy Dees, and came away with a 9–7 win. In Game 4 at Lowell Park, the Kettleers again took an early lead, up 6–0 after three, on their way to an 8–1 win that secured the team's 10th league title.

Innis returned for the 1982 season, and was all-league once again, posting a 1.96 ERA with 54 strikeouts. He was joined by CCBL Hall of Famer Terry Steinbach, who led the league with a stunning .431 batting average and was named league MVP. The 1983 Kettleers featured another pair of CCBL Hall of Famers. Outfielder Greg Lotzar practically duplicated Steinbach's feat of the previous year, leading the league in batting with a lofty .414 mark, and being named league MVP, while also setting a league record with 33 stolen bases. Future major leaguer Will Clark hit .367 with 10 homers as the Kettleers' first basemen. The talented 1983 team reached the CCBL title series, but was downed by Harwich.

The 1984 Kettleers finished the regular season in third place, and in an unusual move, the league's 1984 playoffs were contested in a four-team double-elimination round-robin format. The tournament came down to a final pair of games between Cotuit and Wareham, a team skippered by a young Mike Roberts. The first game was a must-win for Cotuit, and hurler Joe Lynch was up to the task. Lynch spun a two-hitter, and CCBL Hall of Fame slugger Greg Vaughn doubled and scored the game-winning run on a wild pitch in the fifth that put the Kettleers up by the final 2–1 tally. Cotuit took the decisive final game on the strength of Vaughn's three-run homer in the sixth, claiming its 11th championship crown.

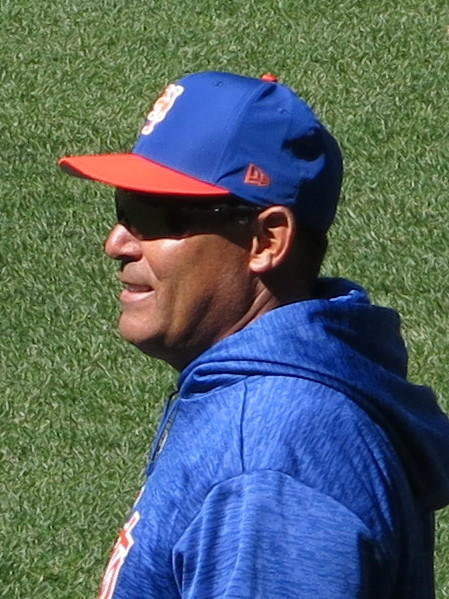
Rubén Amaro Jr. belted a key home run in Cotuit's 1985 title series.

Cotuit's playoff hero Vaughn was back in 1985, and took home league MVP honors, batting .343 with 10 homers and 15 stolen bases. The '85 Kettleers also boasted the league's Outstanding Pro Prospect in John Ramos, as well as future major leaguer Rubén Amaro Jr., and ace hurler Grady Hall. The team finished second in the league with an impressive 28–14 record, and met Harwich in the playoff semifinals. The Kettleers got a three-run dinger from Amaro, and Hall got the win on the mound as Cotuit took Game 1 at home by a 6–3 final. Games 2 & 3 were played as a doubleheader, with the Mariners taking the Game 2 front end, 1–0. Cotuit bats erupted in the Game 3 finale, taking the series with a 10–2 win. In the championship series, the Kettleers faced Chatham, and went down to a 4–3 defeat in Game 1. Cotuit bounced back with an 8–1 win in Game 2 at home behind the mound work of Hall and an offensive explosion that included a two-run dinger by Vaughn. In the decisive Game 3 finale at Chatham, the Kettleers got a complete game gem from Steffan Majer, Amaro blasted a three-run homer, and Vaughn added a solo shot in Cotuit's 5–2 win. Hall was named playoff MVP, and Greer had his second consecutive title and third overall. The 1986 Kettleers featured the league's Outstanding Pro Prospect, Cris Carpenter, and reached the league title series for the fourth consecutive season, but fell to Orleans. 1988 Kettleer Jeff Kent went on to enjoy a distinguished major league career, retiring as the all-time home run leader among second basemen, and earning induction to the National Baseball Hall of Fame in 2026.

==== Another pair of championships in the 1990s ====
Skipper Roger Bidwell led the Kettleers to a first-place finish atop the West Division in 1992. The team starred CCBL Hall of Famer and Framingham, Massachusetts native Lou Merloni, an infielder from Providence College, who led the league with a .321 batting average and was honored with the league's Sportsmanship Award. Joining Merloni were league MVP Rick Ellstrom, and the CCBL Outstanding Pitcher, John Kelly. The talented '92 squad returned to the league championship series, but was shut down by Chatham.

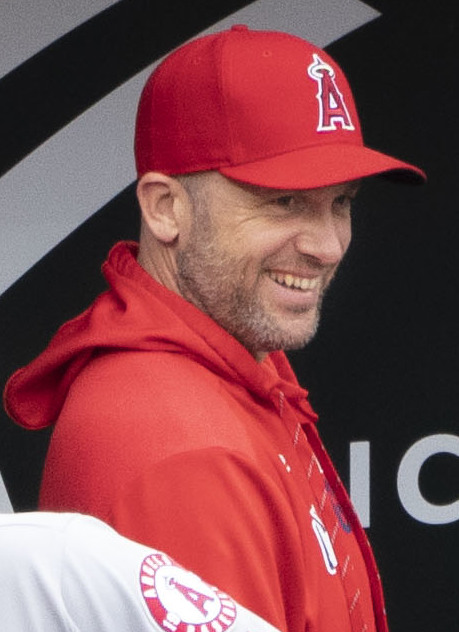
Josh Paul was league MVP and playoff co-MVP for the 1995 CCBL champion Kettleers.

First-year manager Mike Coutts led Cotuit to another first-place finish in 1995. His club's unquestioned star was CCBL Hall of Fame catcher/outfielder Josh Paul, who won the league's batting crown with a .364 mark, and slugged .652 on his way to being named both the league MVP and Outstanding Pro Prospect. The team also boasted CCBL Hall of Fame pitcher Jack Cressend, who went 7–1 with a 2.44 ERA for the Kettleers. In the playoff semifinals against Wareham, Cressend had the Kets tied 1–1 going into the final frame of Game 1, but couldn't hold the lead as the Gatemen pushed across two to take the opener, 3–1. Game 2 provided more late-inning drama as Josh Gandy tossed seven scoreless innings and Cotuit won it in the 10th on Brandon Berger's two-run dinger. Cotuit's Ryan Lynch pitched brilliantly in Game 3, and the game was scoreless until the eighth when the Kettleers pushed across the game's only run on a sacrifice fly to win the series. In the finals, Cotuit met East Division champ Chatham, and took Game 1 handily, 16–6. Cressend got touched up for seven runs in Chatham's 9–3 Game 2 win, setting up the Game 3 rubber match at Lowell Park. Coutts sent Gandy to the hill, and the game was tight until the Kettleers erupted for seven runs in the fifth, punctuated by Glenn Davis' three-run bomb. Gandy held the Chatham bats at bay, and Kevin Sheredy came on in relief to get the final five outs and secure the crown for the Kettleers. Gandy and Paul shared playoff MVP honors.

Coutts' 1996 Kettleers returned hurlers Cressend and Gandy, and both had memorable seasons. Cressend improved on his impressive prior season's marks, going 7–0 with a 1.89 ERA, and Gandy tossed a no-hitter in a 1–0 victory over Wareham.

Tom Walter took over for Coutts in 1997 and 1998, but Coutts was back in 1999 and led the team to another first-place finish. The '99 team starred CCBL Hall of Famer Garrett Atkins, an all-star infielder who had batted .383 for the Kettleers in 1998, and returned to have another all-star season in 1999. Cotuit met Wareham in the playoff semifinals, and swept the Gatemen in two straight. The Game 2 finale was a masterful 5–0 complete game two-hit shutout by pitcher Andy Warren, with the offensive highlight coming in the third with a three-run blast by Atkins. Cotuit met Chatham in the finals for the third time in the decade, having split the previous two meetings. The teams split the first two games of the 1999 title tilt, setting up a decisive Game 3. The Kettleers sent 6-foot-7 righty Mike Schultz to the hill, and staked him to an early 4–0 lead on an RBI single and homer by Atkins. Schultz made it hold up, tossing a complete game in Cotuit's 7–1 victory. Atkins was named playoff MVP of the Kettleers' 14th championship campaign.

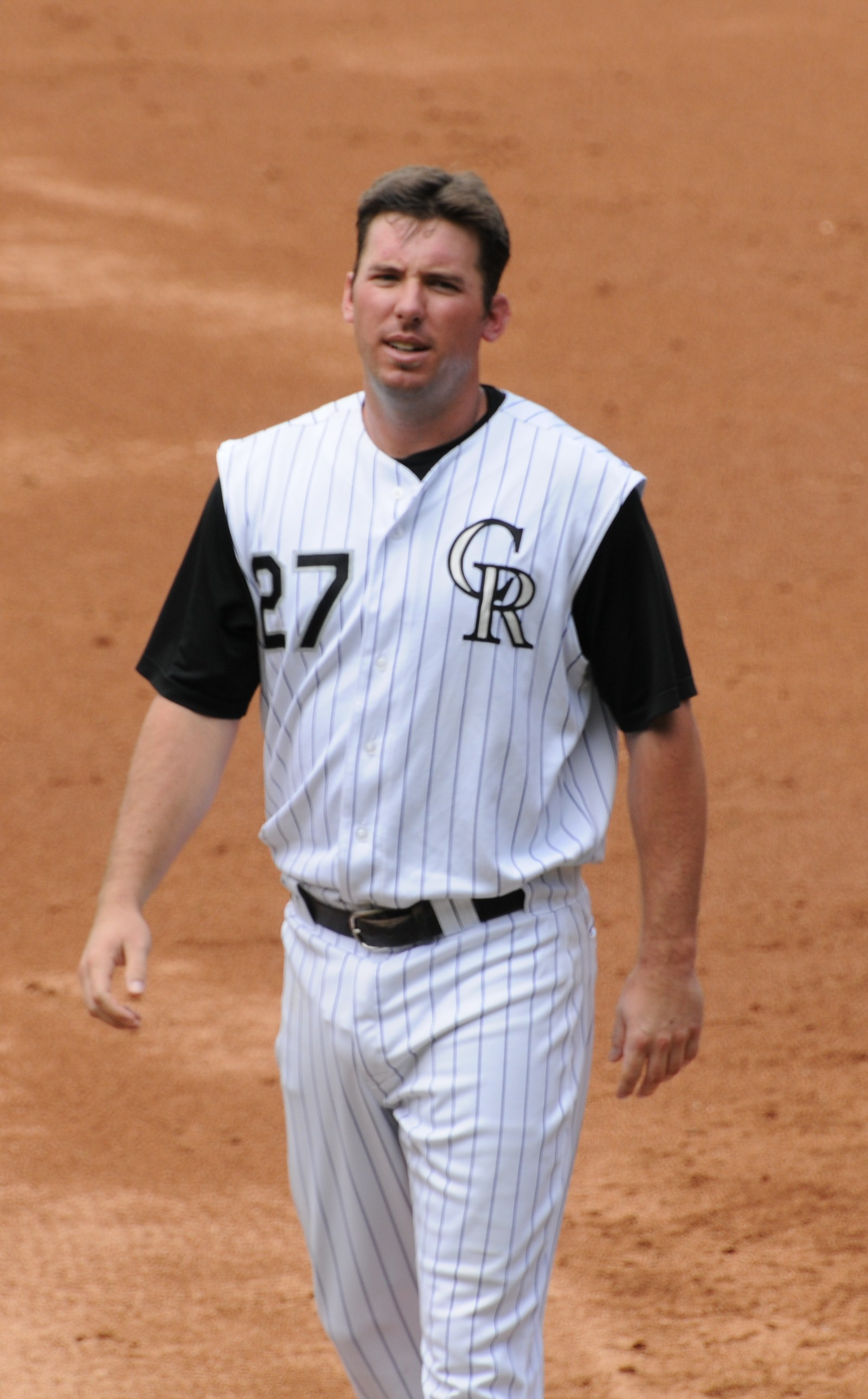
CCBL Hall of Famer Garrett Atkins led Cotuit to the 1999 CCBL title.

==== The 2000s: The Roberts era begins ====
Garrett Quinn piloted the Kettleers to a first-place finish atop the West Division in 2002, as Cotuit set a new Cape League record by winning its first 13 games of the season, a streak which included a combined no-hitter against Chatham at Lowell Park by Kettleer moundsmen Joe Little, Jarred Stuart, Kevin Ool, and Josh Banks. The club was led by league MVP Pete Stonard, who led the league with a .348 batting average, and third baseman Brian Snyder, who took home All-Star Game MVP honors for his home run and 3-for-4, 3-RBI performance in the West's 4–1 victory.

Skipper Mike Roberts took the Kettleer helm in 2004, and became the longest-tenured manager in team history. First baseman and CCBL Hall of Famer Justin Smoak was league MVP for Cotuit in 2006, leading the league with 11 homers, 21 extra-base hits, and a .565 slugging percentage. The Kettleers reached the league championship series in 2008, but were downed by Harwich. In a season highlighted by Chad Bell's no-hitter against Chatham, Roberts again led the 2009 Kettleers to the league championship, but the club was shut down by Bourne.

==== The 2010s: Three more titles and the passing of a Cotuit legend ====
Roberts' 2010 Kettleers finished the regular season with a losing record, but qualified for the playoffs out of the third place slot in the West Division. After early-round playoff series sweeps of Falmouth and Wareham, the Kettleers met Y-D in the Cape League championship series. In Game 1, Matt Andriese tossed a complete game shutout and Cotuit played small-ball to scratch out a 3–0 win at Red Wilson Field. The Red Sox answered with a 2–1 victory in Game 2, the only Cotuit run coming on an eighth inning homer by James McCann. In Game 3, Cotuit got a homer and a single from Mike Yastrzemski and three hits from Joey Hainsfurther, while Nick Tropeano was shutting down the Red Sox on the mound. The Kettleers rolled to a 6–0 victory for the team's 15th CCBL title and first under Roberts. Jordan Leyland was named playoff MVP, hitting .461 with six RBI's in the postseason.

Cotuit's Victor Roache was the CCBL's Outstanding Pro Prospect in 2011, and in 2012, the Kettleers' Dan Slania won the league's Outstanding Relief Pitcher award. CCBL Hall of Famer Patrick Biondi flirted with the .400 mark in 2012 and finished tops in the league in batting average for Cotuit with a .388 mark.

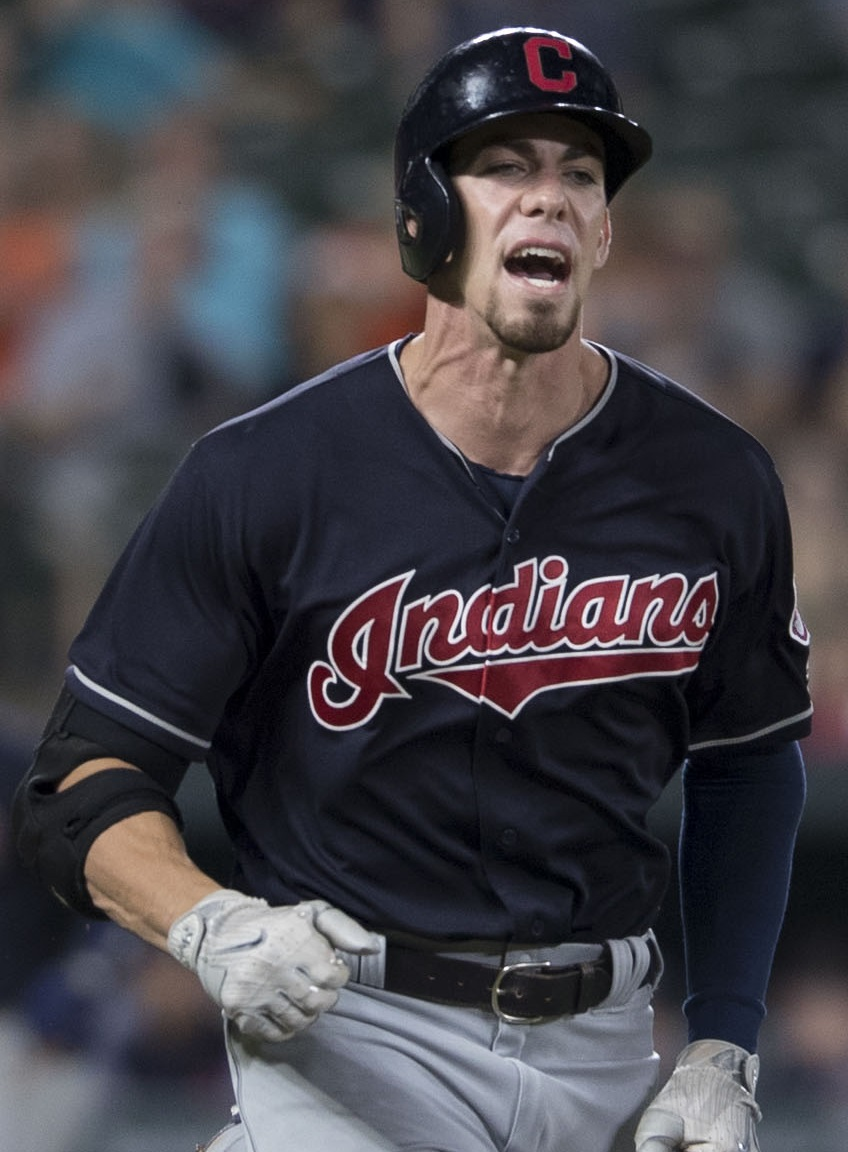
Bradley Zimmer won a CCBL championship with Cotuit in 2013 and was playoff MVP.

Roberts' boys were back in the championship series in 2013. After dropping Game 1 of its opening round playoff series with Falmouth, Cotuit bounced back with an exciting 10-inning 5–4 victory at home, powered by a two-run blast by Austin Byler, and a walk-off 10th inning RBI by Garrett Stubbs. The Kettleers finished off the Commodores with a 5–2 victory at Guv Fuller Field, and went on to meet Bourne in the West Division finals. Byler again went deep in Game 1 at Lowell Park, and Caleb Bryson added a dinger in the 9–2 romp over the Braves. Bourne stormed back in Game 2 at Doran Park, routing Cotuit, 8–1. The Game 3 finale was tied, 3–3, in the eighth when Kettleer Drew Jackson poked the game-winning RBI to give Cotuit the series win, and send the Kettleers to the title series to face the Orleans Firebirds. In Game 1 of the 2013 championship, Bryson bashed a two-run first inning homer and Bradley Zimmer belted a two-run single to give Cotuit the 4–2 victory in the opener. Game 2 at Eldredge Park was tight until the eighth, when Cotuit blew it open with four runs on an Orleans error and a two-run knock by Nolan Clark. The Kettleers prevailed, 6–2, to sweep the title series and claim the crown, with Zimmer taking playoff MVP honors.

The Kettleers retired uniform number "1" in 2016, in honor of the passing of Cotuit legend Arnold Mycock, whose decades of service and contribution to the team and league were unparalleled. 2017 saw the passing of another Kettleer mainstay in superfan Ivan Partridge, who began attending Kettleer games in the 1950s, and whose booming encouragement for batters to "Have a hit!" became a signature call at Lowell Park. Kettleers took home top honors in 2017 as Greyson Jenista was named league MVP, and Griffin Conine, son of former major leaguer and Orleans Cardinal Jeff Conine, was named the league's Outstanding Pro Prospect.

The 2019 Kettleers finished the regular season with a .500 record, and appeared primed for an early playoff exit after a 10-inning 8–7 loss in Game 1 of the opening round of playoffs at Wareham. Cotuit responded with an offensive eruption in Game 2, pummeling the Gatemen, 22–2, behind a five-RBI performance by Kettleer Oraj Anu. In the decisive Game 3, the Kettleers got a homer from Matt Mervis, and Casey Schmitt twirled the final five innings of two-hit shutout relief in the 4–1 win. In Game 1 of the West Division finals at Falmouth, Cotuit moundsmen Trey Holland and Bo Hofstra combined for a 5–0 shutout win. The Kettleers completed the sweep at home in Game 2 behind a two-run blast by league MVP and CCBL Hall of Famer Nick Gonzales, and a solo shot by Parker Chavers in the 5–3 win that sent Cotuit to the championship series in search of its 17th league title. The 2019 CCBL finals pitted the Kettleers against the Harwich Mariners. Game 1 at Whitehouse Field was a marathon five-hour affair, featuring 6 scoreless innings of relief in extra innings by pitcher Richard Brereton. Gonzales ended the stalemate in the top of the 15th with an RBI single to put Cotuit up 7–6, and closer Kyle Nicolas came on in the bottom of the frame to strike out the side and preserve the Kettleer win. Game 2 at Lowell Park saw Schmitt, who was named playoff MVP, blast two home runs then come in to pitch the ninth inning in relief in a 10–3 rout of the Mariners that secured the crown for Cotuit. The 2019 title brought the Kettleer championship count to 15 in the modern era and 17 overall, a record that is unmatched among CCBL franchises.

==== The 2020s ====
The 2020 CCBL season was cancelled due to the coronavirus pandemic. Cotuit's 2022 club was led by the league's Outstanding Pro Prospect award winner Tommy Troy and Outstanding Relief Pitcher Cam Schuelke. Camron Hill took home the CCBL Outstanding Pitcher award in 2023, and Jarren Advincula topped the league in batting average in 2024 with a lofty .392 mark. Longtime skipper Mike Roberts' tenure came to an end after the 2024 season, and Loren Hibbs took over managerial duties in 2025.

== CCBL Hall of Fame inductees ==
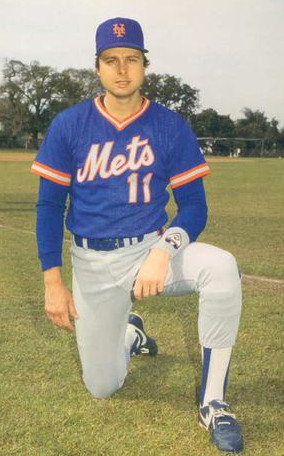
CCBL Hall of Famer Tim Teufel

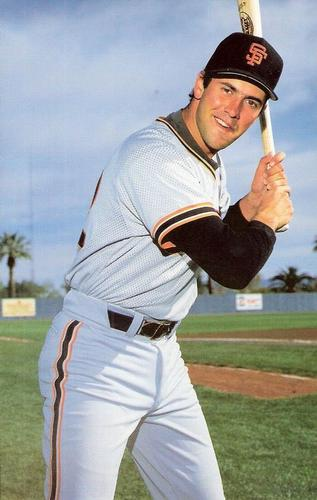
CCBL Hall of Famer Will Clark

The CCBL Hall of Fame and Museum is a history museum and hall of fame honoring past players, coaches, and others who have made outstanding contributions to the CCBL. Below are the inductees who spent all or part of their time in the Cape League with Cotuit.

Year Inducted	Ref.	Name	Position
2000		Arnold Mycock	Executive
2000		Jeff Reardon	Player
2001		Cal Burlingame	Player / Manager / Umpire
2001		Terry Steinbach	Player
2002		Bernie Kilroy	Player
2002		Ron Darling	Player
2002		George Greer	Manager
2003		Jack McCarthy	Player / Manager
2003		Jim Perkins	Player / Manager
2004		Bob Butkus	Player
2004		Will Clark	Player
2005		Tim Teufel	Player
2006		Jim Hubbard	Player / Manager
2006		Greg Lotzar	Player
2006		Josh Paul	Player
2007		Del Bender	Player
2008		Bob Hansen	Player
2008		Jeff Innis	Player
2009		Greg Vaughn	Player
2010		Jack Cressend	Player
2010		Lou Merloni	Player
2011		Paul O'Neill	Player
2012		John "Jack" Aylmer	Executive
2013		Garrett Atkins	Player
2014		Donald Hicks Sr.	Player
2022		Justin Smoak	Player
2022		Patrick Biondi	Player
2025		Nick Gonzales	Player

== Notable alumni ==
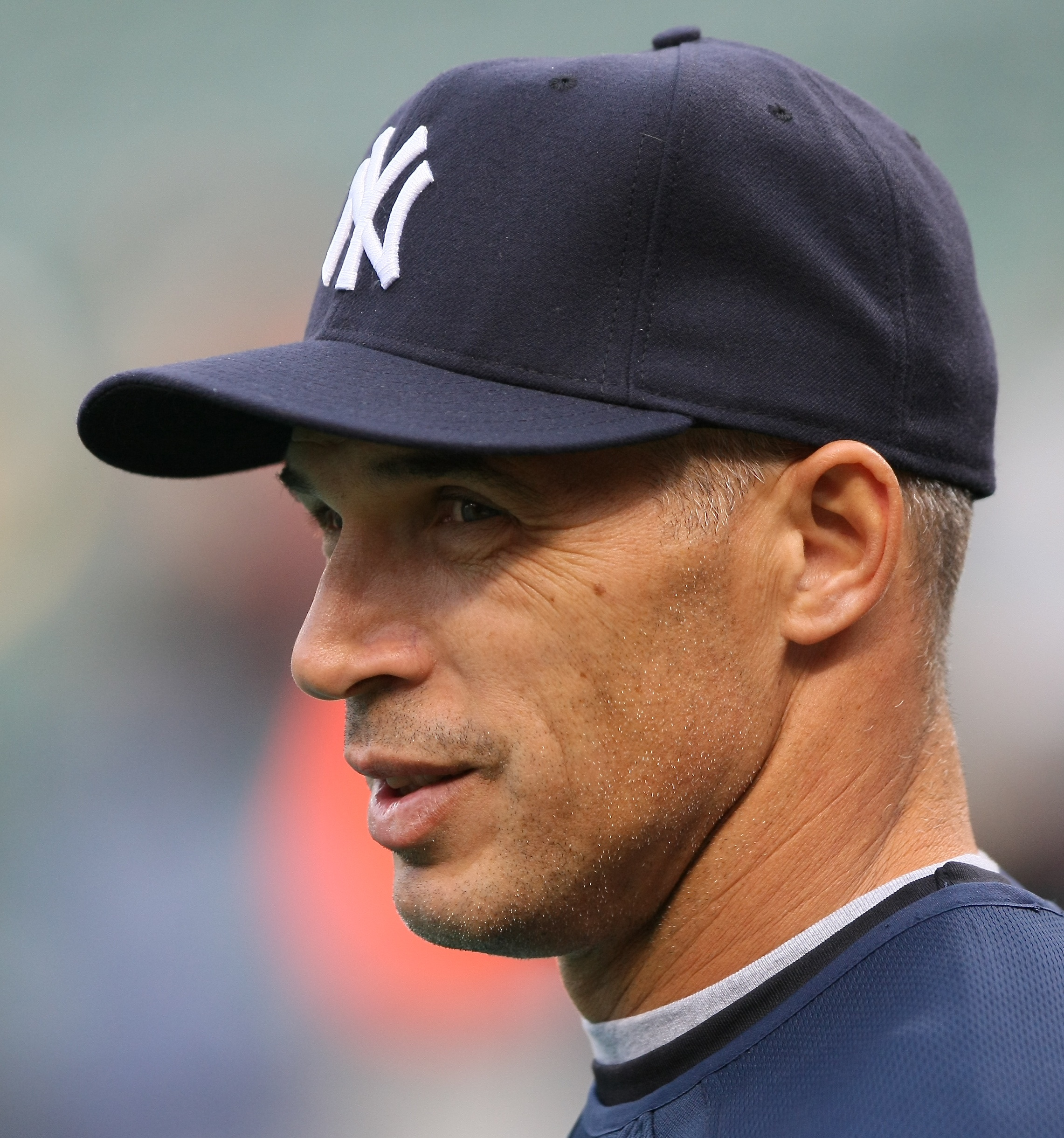
Joe Girardi

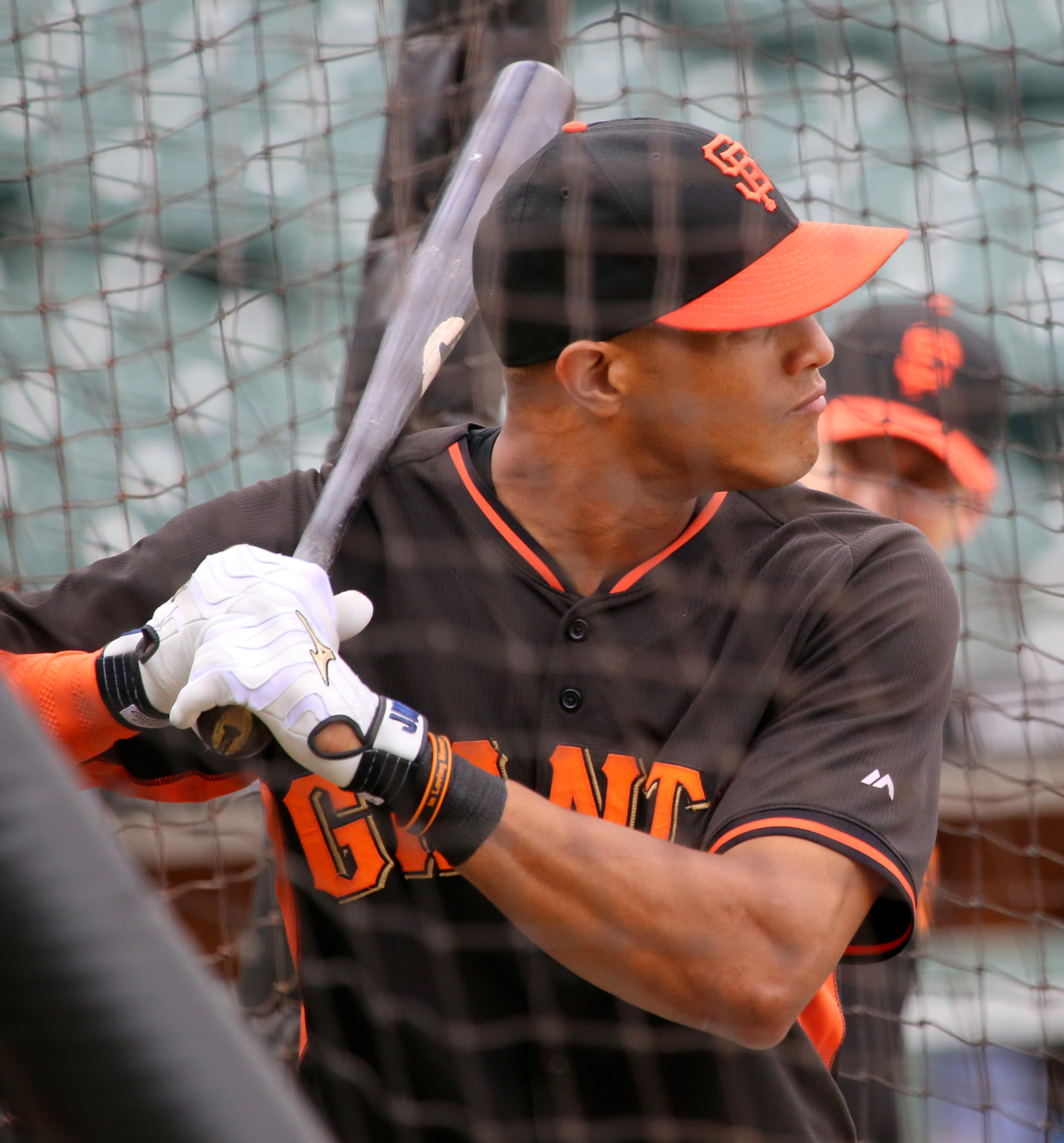
Justin Maxwell

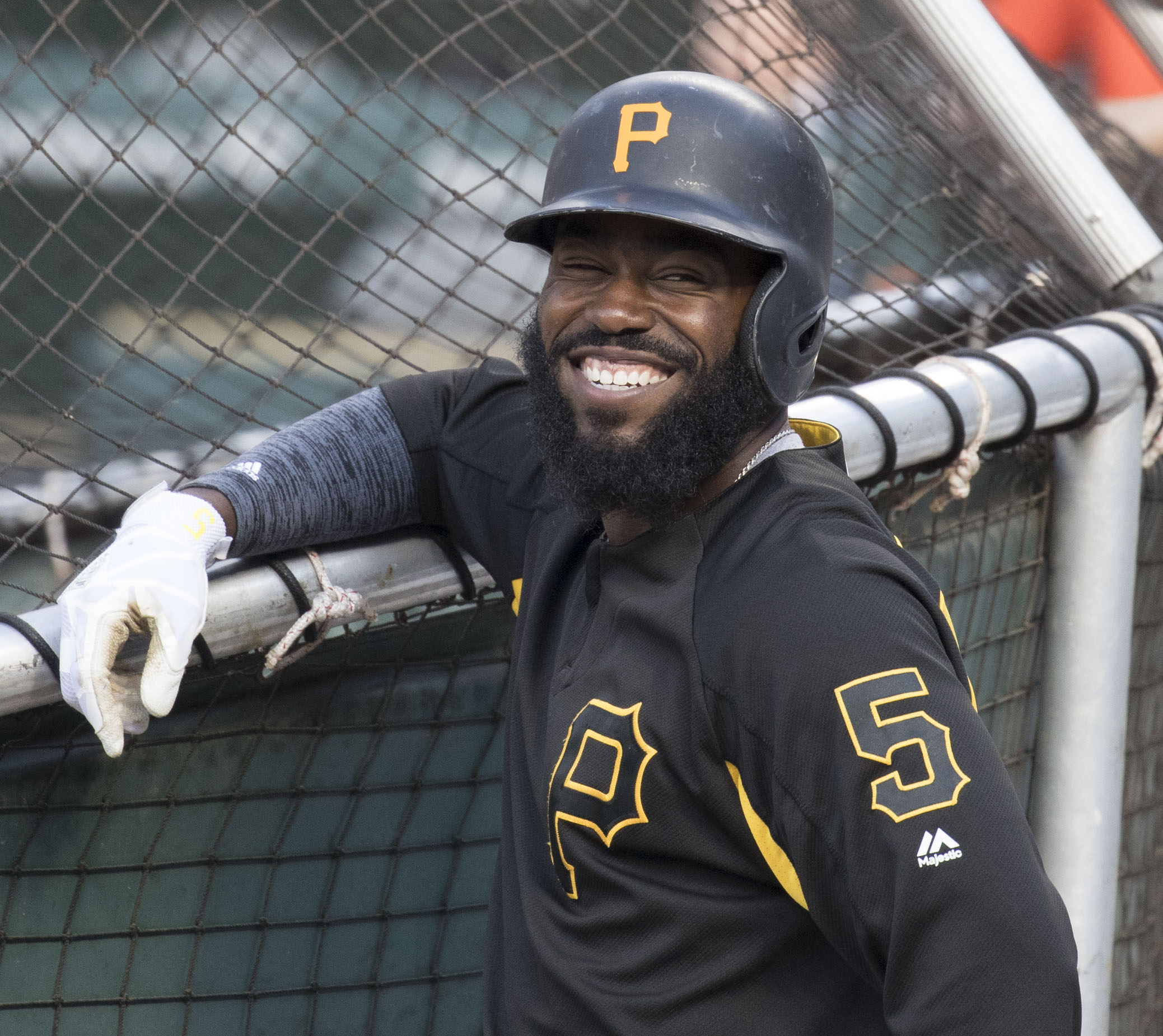
Josh Harrison

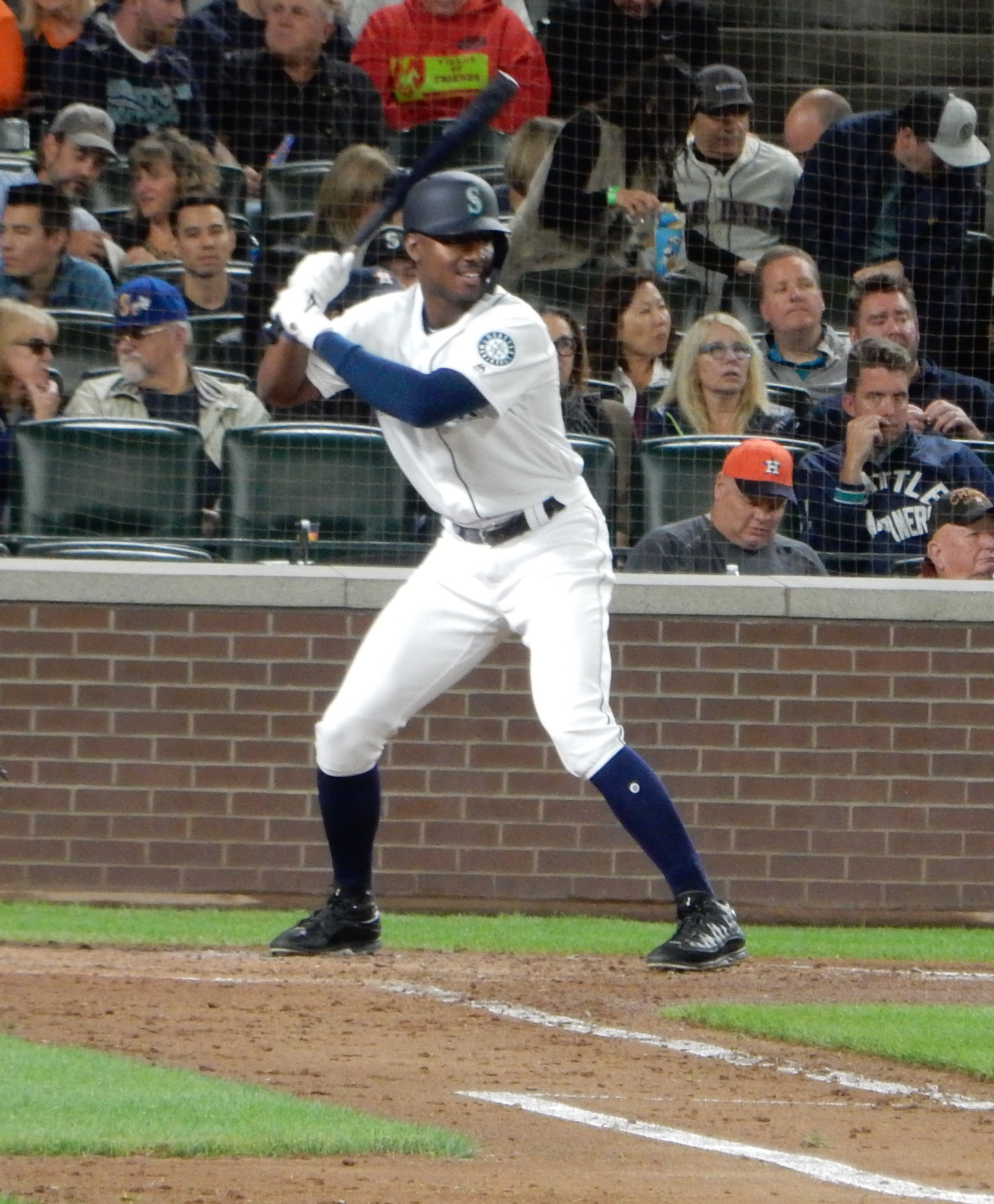
Kyle Lewis

- A. J. Achter 2010
- Stephen Alemais 2015
- Jermaine Allensworth 1992
- Rubén Amaro Jr. 1985–1986
- Brian Anderson 2002
- Jack Anderson 2015
- Matt Andriese 2010
- Matt Angle 2006
- Randy Asadoor 1982
- Garrett Atkins 1998–1999
- Jeff Austin 1996
- John Axford 2003
- Jeff Baisley 2003
- Brooks Baldwin 2021–2022
- Josh Banks 2002
- Tres Barrera 2014
- Brett Bateman 2023
- Dylan Beavers 2021
- Chris Beck 2011
- Joe Beckwith 1975
- Chad Bell 2009
- Mark Bellhorn 1993
- Max Belyeu 2024
- Brandon Berger 1995
- Dusty Bergman 1998
- Jason Beverlin 1993
- Jason Bilous 2016–2017
- Chris Bisson 2009
- Dan Black 2008
- Charlie Blackmon 2005
- Seth Blair 2008–2009
- Julio Borbón 2005
- Joe Boyle 2018
- Brad Brach 2007
- Enrique Bradfield 2022
- Darren Bragg 1989
- Ryan Braun, RHP 2002
- Jerry Brooks 1987
- Rex Brothers 2007
- Eric Brown 2021
- Hunter Brown 2018
- Barret Browning 2005
- Ryan Brownlee 1996
- J. T. Bruett 1986–1988
- Eric Bruntlett 1997
- Jake Buchanan 2009
- Kevin Buckley 1978
- Troy Buckley 1988
- Mike Buddie 1990–1991
- Damon Buford 1989–1990
- Nate Bump 1996
- Peyton Burdick 2018
- Michael Byrne 2017
- Kevin Campbell 1984
- Andy Cannizaro 1999
- Chris Capuano 1997–1998
- Cole Carlon 2025
- Cris Carpenter 1986
- Curt Casali 2010
- Giuseppe Chiaramonte 1996
- Rick Chryst 1982
- Matt Clark 2007
- Will Clark 1983
- Mike Clevinger 2011
- Zach Cole 2022
- Cam Collier 2022
- Zack Collins 2015
- Steve Comer 1974
- Griffin Conine 2017
- Zack Cox 2009
- Doug Creek 1990
- Jack Cressend 1995–1996
- C. J. Cron 2010
- Brandon Cumpton 2008
- Ron Darling 1980
- Noah Davis 2017
- Jason Delay 2016
- Brian Denman 1977
- Sean DePaula 1994
- Thomas Dillard 2017–2018
- Jason Donald 2004–2005
- Patrick Dorrian 2016
- Steven Duggar 2013
- Justin Dunn 2015
- Chris Dwyer 2009
- Chris Ellis 2013
- Duke Ellis 2019
- Nic Enright 2018
- Scott Erickson 1989
- Geno Espineli 2002–2003
- Anthony Eyanson 2024
- Eric Farris 2006
- Darren Fenster 1998
- Chris Fetter 2007
- Kyle Finnegan 2012
- Jeff Fiorentino 2003
- Jameson Fisher 2014
- Bernardo Flores 2015
- Ryan Folmar 1994
- Mike Ford 2012–2013
- John Franco 1980
- Matt Galante 1964
- Aramis Garcia 2012–2013
- Cory Gearrin 2006
- Tony Giarratano 2002
- Keagan Gillies 2018
- Kevin Ginkel 2015
- Joe Girardi 1984
- Graham Godfrey 2006
- Yan Gomes 2007
- Rio Gomez 2016
- Nick Gonzales 2019
- Danny Goodwin 1973
- Matt Grace 2009
- AJ Gracia 2024
- Andre Granillo 2021
- Kendall Graveman 2011
- Jason Grilli 1995
- Justin Grimm 2009
- Bob Hansen 1967–1968
- Aaron Harang 1998
- Josh Harrison 2007
- Bo Hart 1998
- Reese Havens 2006–2007
- Brett Hayes 2004
- Chase Headley 2004
- Ryon Healy 2011
- Joe Hesketh 1979
- Bryan Hickerson 1985
- Luke Hochevar 2003
- Kyle Holder 2014
- Mario Hollands 2008
- Grant Holman 2019
- Tyler Holt 2008
- Ken Howell 1981
- Justin Huisman 1999
- Jeff Innis 1981–1982
- Brett Jackson 2008
- Drew Jackson 2014
- Tom Jacquez 1996
- Bryce Jarvis 2018
- Kevin Jarvis 1990
- Greyson Jenista 2017
- Dan Jennings 2008
- Mike Jerzembeck 1993
- Keith Johns 1991
- Micah Johnson 2011
- Ty Johnson 2022
- Barry Jones 1983
- Caleb Joseph 2007
- Jimmy Journell 1998
- Evan Justice 2019
- Kyle Karros 2022
- C. J. Kayfus 2022
- Tony Kemp 2012
- Jeren Kendall 2015–2016
- Jeff Kent 1988
- Sean Keys 2023–2024
- Jason Kipnis 2008
- Daron Kirkreit 1992
- Austin Kitchen 2017
- Jeff Kobernus 2008
- Tim Kubinski 1992
- Jack Kucek 1973
- Kellen Kulbacki 2006
- Marc LaMacchia 2002
- Brett Laxton 1994
- Jack Lazorko 1976
- Kyle Lewis 2014
- Derek Lilliquist 1986–1987
- Josh Lindblom 2007
- Christian Little 2022
- Ryan Lollis 2007
- Caleb Lomavita 2022–2023
- Braden Looper 1994
- Joey Loperfido 2019
- Mike MacDougal 1997
- Luke Maile 2011
- Jeff Manship 2005
- Deven Marrero 2010–2011
- Robby Martin 2019
- Bill Masse 1985–1987
- Mike Matheny 1989
- Quinn Mathews 2021
- Justin Maxwell 2004
- Jacob May 2012
- Tim Mayza 2012
- Patrick Mazeika 2013
- Zach McCambley 2019
- James McCann 2010
- David McCarty 1989
- Adam McCreery 2012
- Jason McDonald 1993
- Dallas McPherson 2000
- Lou Merloni 1992
- Matt Mervis 2019
- Dan Meyer 2001
- Bart Miadich 1997
- A. J. Minter 2014
- Anthony Misiewicz 2015
- Kade Morris 2022
- Daniel Moskos 2005
- Tim Naehring 1987
- Cotton Nash 1963
- John Nathans 2000
- Kyle Nicolas 2019
- Rico Noel 2009
- Josh Paul 1995
- Graham Pauley 2022
- Mark Payton 2013
- Steve Pearce 2004
- Kyle Peterson 1995–1996
- Robb Quinlan 1997
- Omar Quintanilla 2002
- John Ramos 1985
- Jeff Reardon 1974–1976
- Gary Redus 1977
- Will Remillard 2013
- Laddie Renfroe 1982
- Raph Rhymes 2012
- Ben Rice 2021
- Garrett Richards 2007
- Bill Richardson 1967
- Edwin Ríos 2013
- Ryan Ritter 2021
- Victor Roache 2011
- Will Robertson 2018
- Marteese Robinson 1987
- Brock Rodden 2023
- Brady Rodgers 2010
- Joshua Rojas 2015
- Ben Rowen 2009
- Dan Runzler 2006
- Cameron Rupp 2009
- Kyle Russell 2006
- Joe Russo 1963–1964
- Kirk Saarloos 1999
- Mike Saipe 1992–1993
- Emeel Salem 2005
- Tim Salmon 1988
- Clint Sammons 2003
- Dane Sardinha 1999
- Tim Scannell 1990
- Casey Schmitt 2019
- Stephen Schoch 2017–2018
- Max Schrock 2013
- Mike Schultz 1999
- Victor Scott II 2022
- J. B. Shuck 2007
- Chase Shugart 2017
- Brian Simmons 1994
- Dan Simonds 1984, 1986
- Chandler Simpson 2022
- Tony Sipp 2004
- Dan Slania 2012
- Kyle Sleeth 2001
- Brian Slocum 2001
- Ryan Smith (baseball) 2018
- Justin Smoak 2006
- D. J. Snelten 2011
- Alex Sogard 2008
- Josh Spence 2010
- Scott Spiezio 1993
- Ed Sprague Jr. 1986
- Cody Stanley 2009
- Terry Steinbach 1982
- Mitch Stetter 2001–2002
- Cal Stevenson 2016
- Robert Stock 2007–2008
- Drew Storen 2008
- Garrett Stubbs 2013
- Devin Taylor 2024
- Tim Teufel 1979
- Rich Thompson 1999
- Erick Threets 2000
- Clay Timpner 2003
- Michael Toglia 2017–2018
- Nick Tropeano 2010
- Tommy Troy 2022
- Chase Utley 1999
- Eric Valent 1996
- Greg Vaughn 1984–1985
- Terrin Vavra 2017
- Anthony Veneziano 2018
- Joey Volchko 2024–2025
- Bobby Wahl 2011
- Ryan Waldschmidt 2023
- Jared Walsh 2013
- Mark Wasinger 1981
- Beck Way 2019
- Keith Weber 1964
- Colby White 2018
- Joe Whitman 2023
- Chris Widger 1991
- Dan Wilson 1988
- Trey Wingenter 2014
- Rhett Wiseman 2013
- Jackson Wolf 2019
- Mark Worrell 2003
- Kyle Wren 2011
- Alex Yarbrough 2011
- Mike Yastrzemski 2010–2011
- Bradley Zimmer 2013
- Kyle Zimmer 2011
- Kevin Ziomek 2011–2012

== Yearly results ==
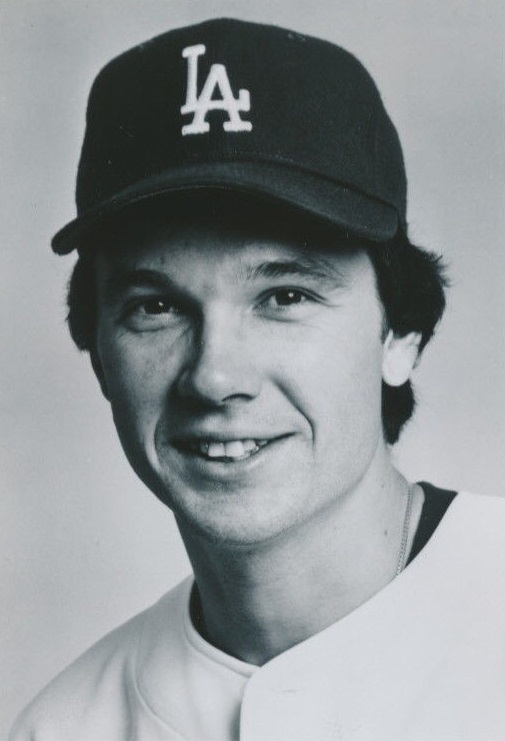
1975 Kettleer hurler Joe Beckwith

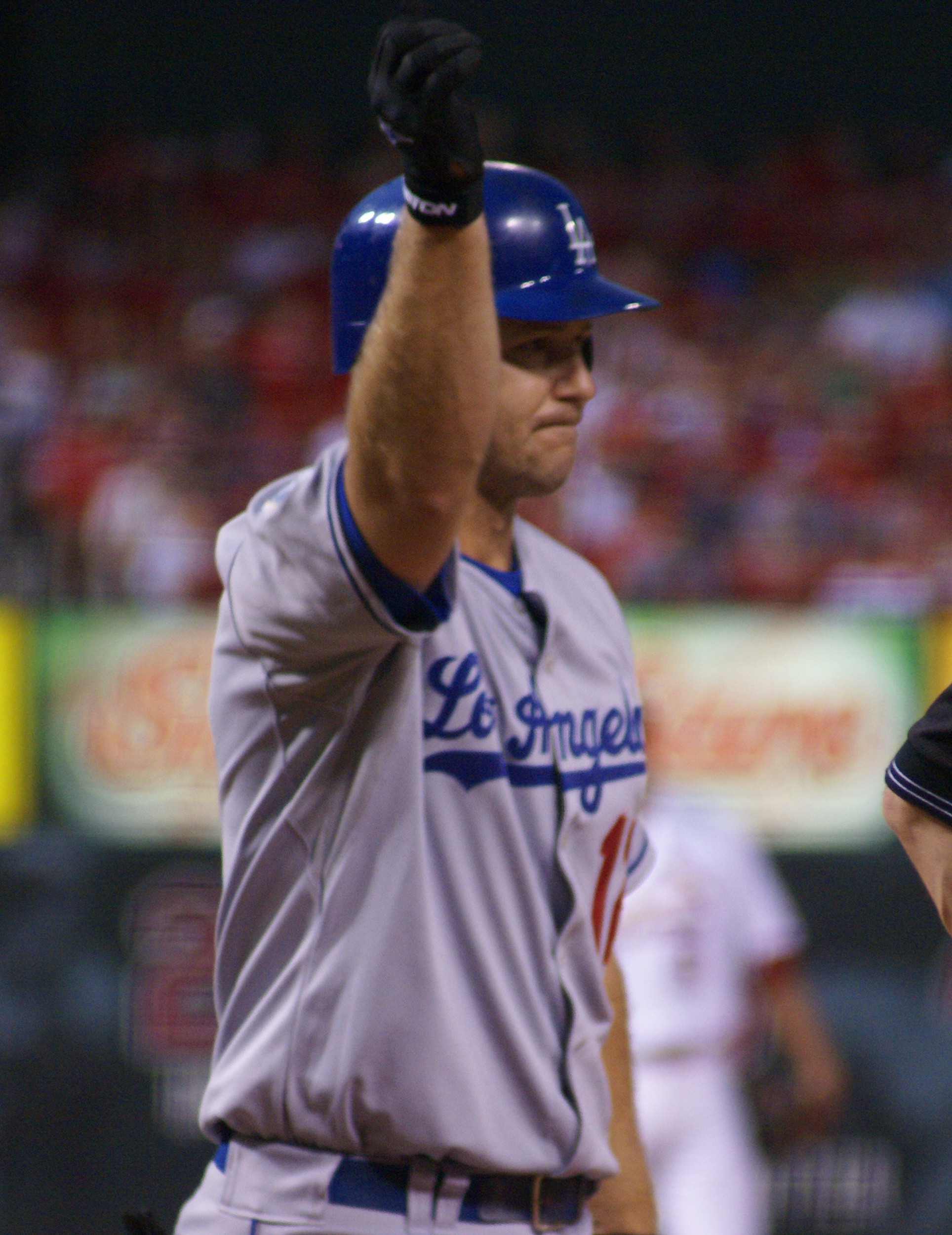
1988 Kettleer Jeff Kent made it to Cooperstown in 2026.

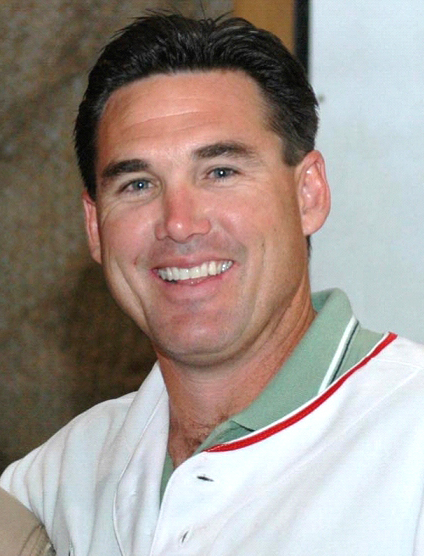
1988 Kettleer Tim Salmon

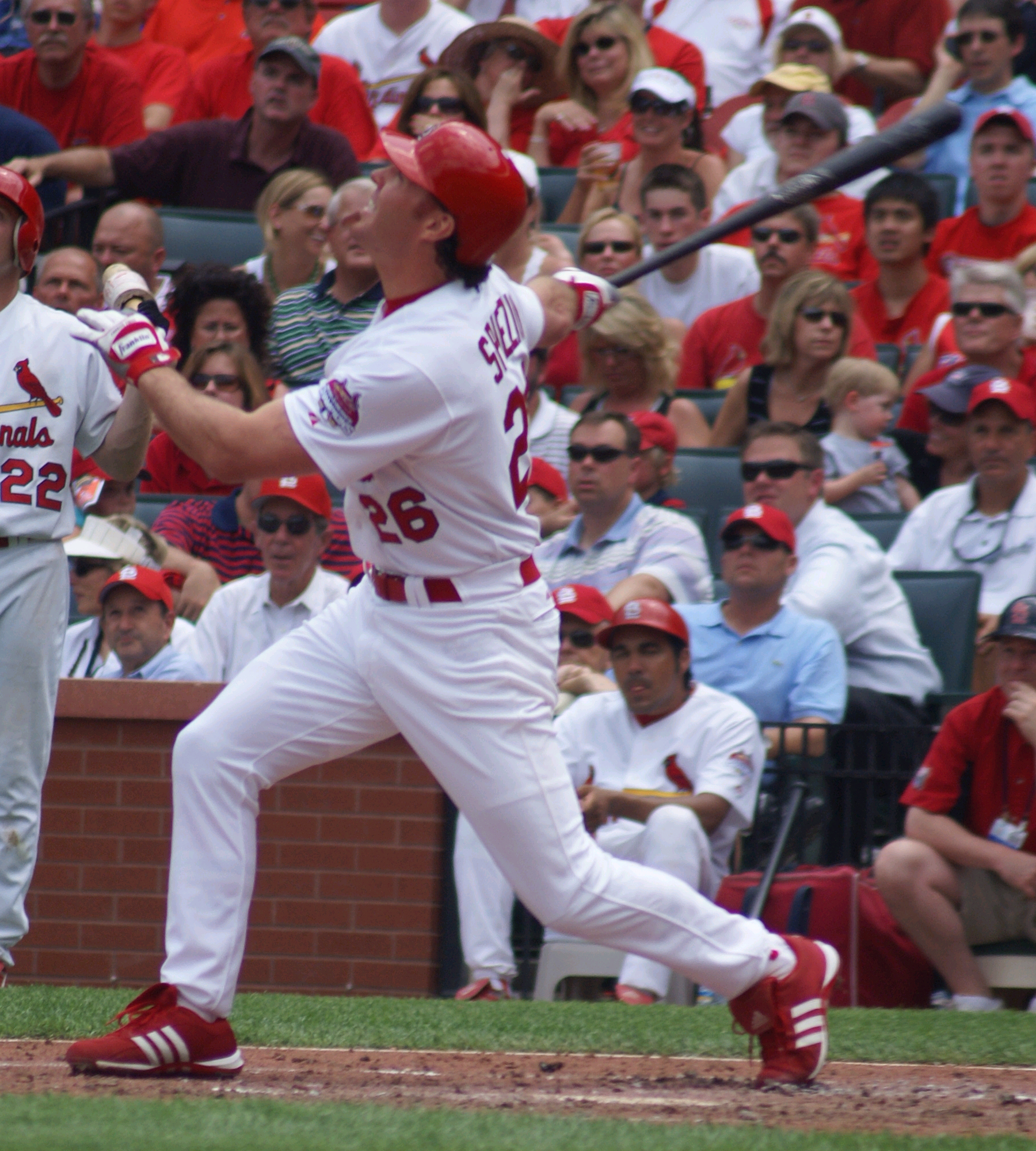
1993 Kettleer Scott Spiezio

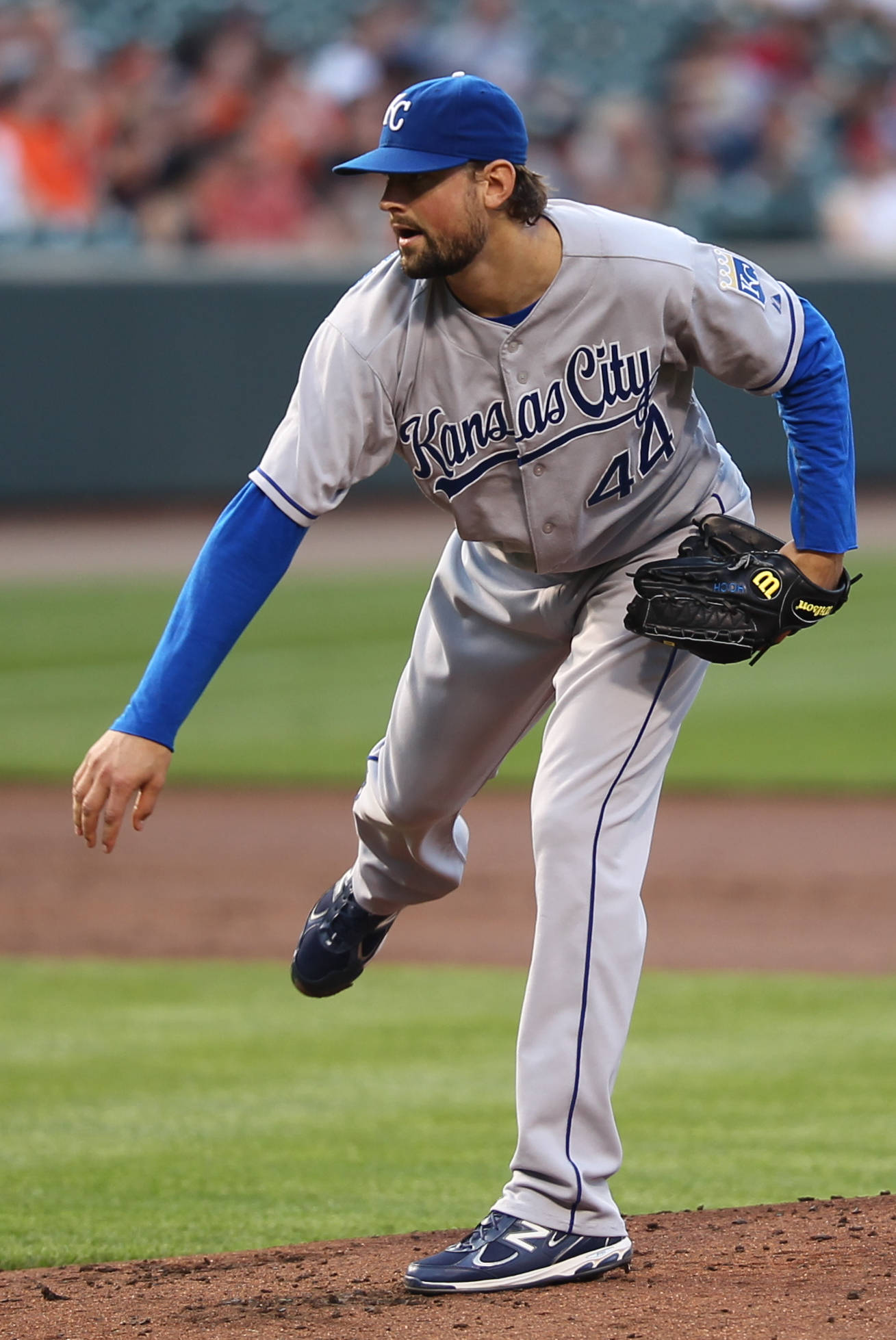
2003 Kettleer Luke Hochevar was the first overall pick in the 2006 MLB draft.

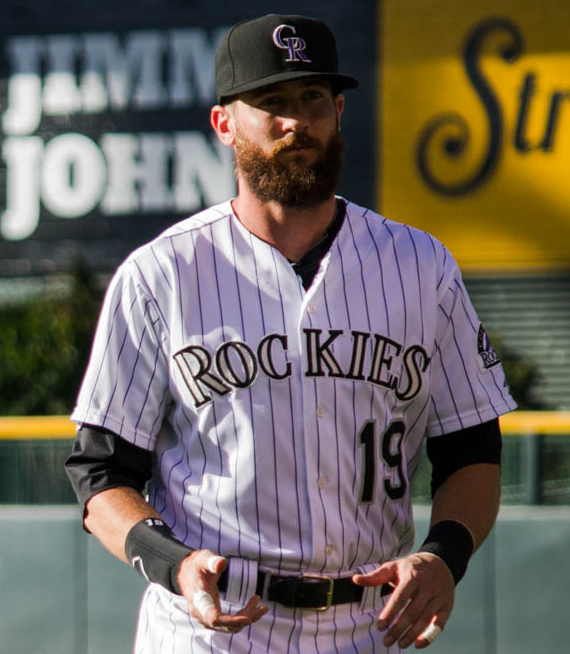
2005 Kettleer Charlie Blackmon

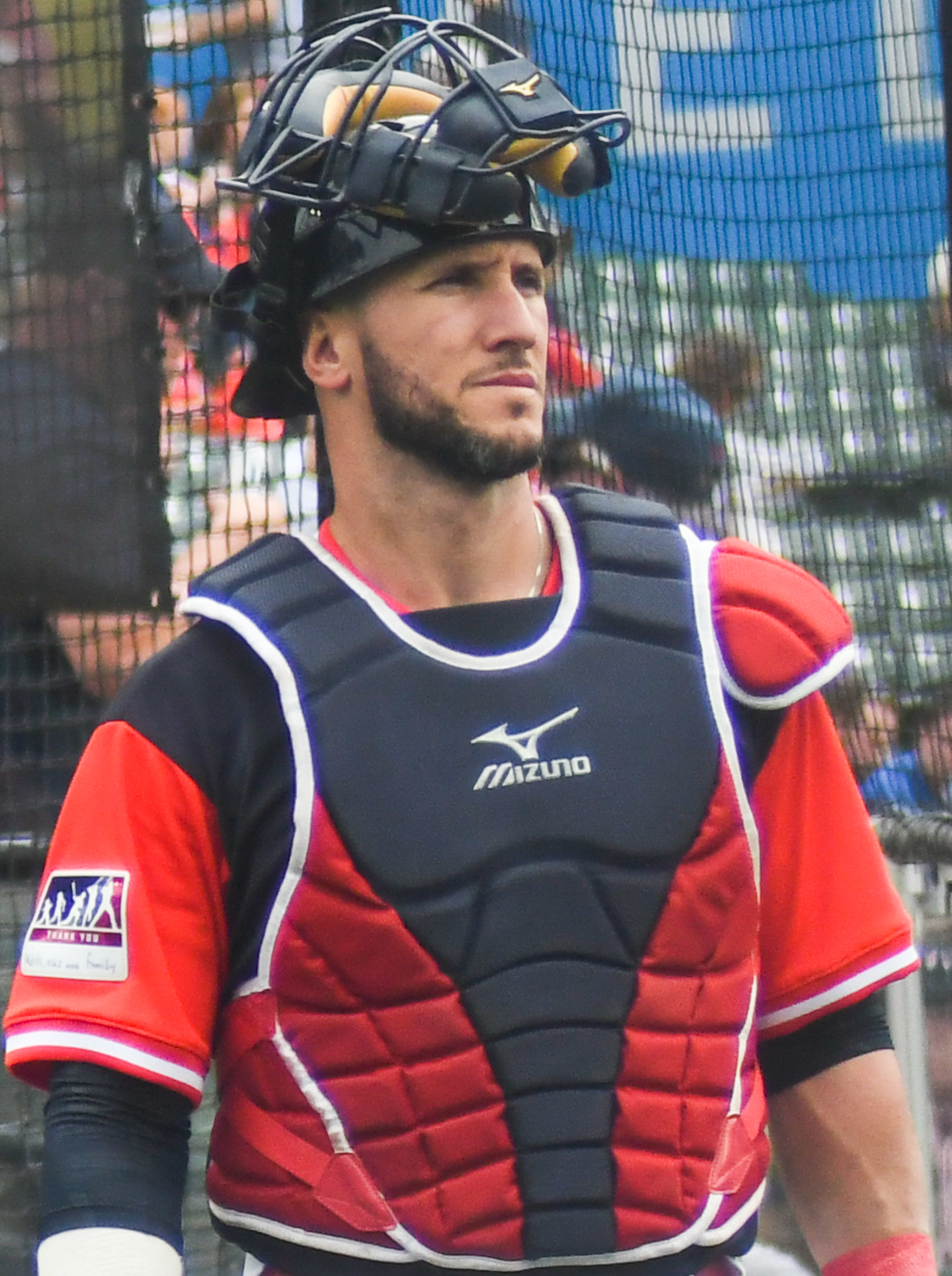
Yan Gomes played for the Kettleers in 2007

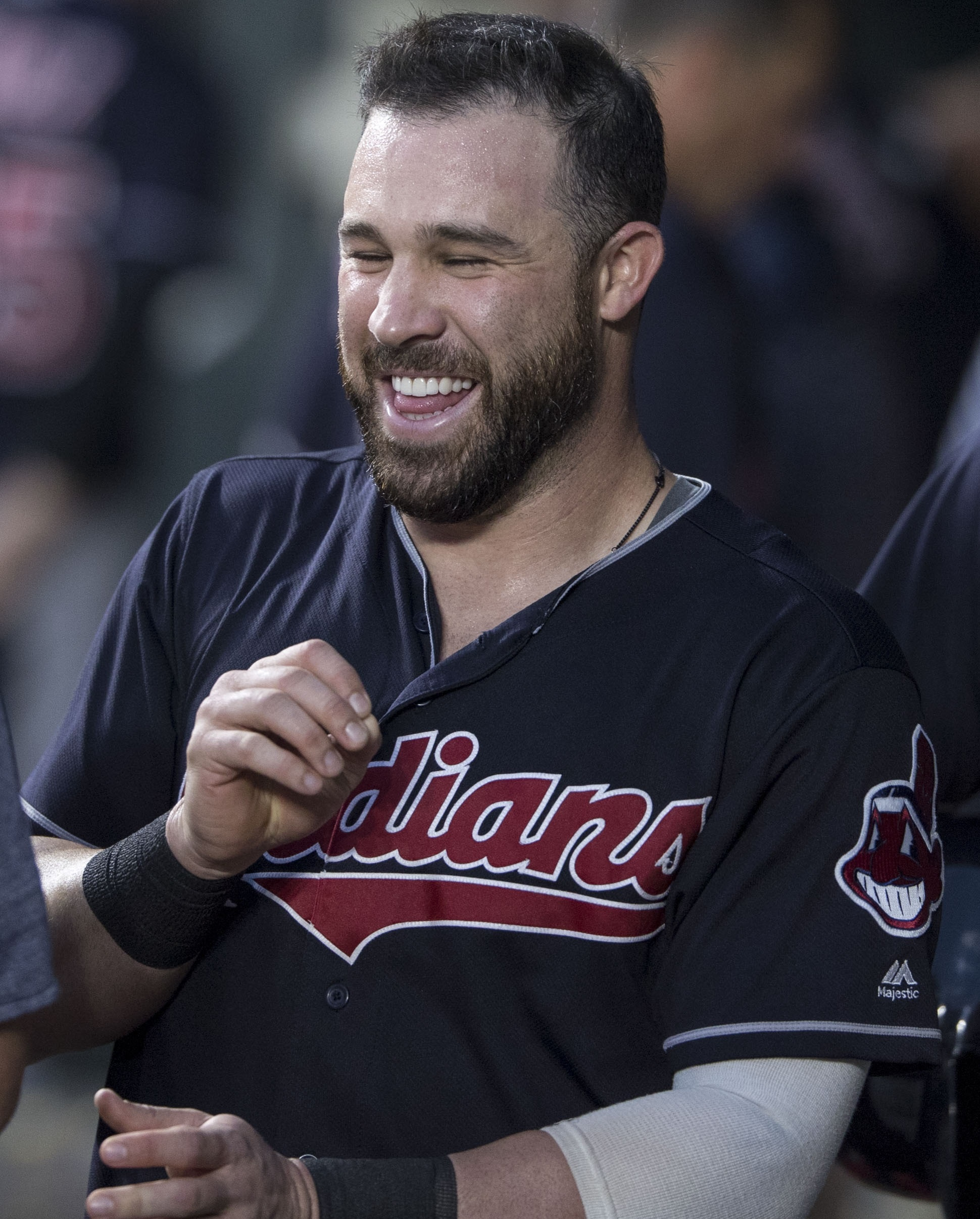
2008 Kettleer Jason Kipnis

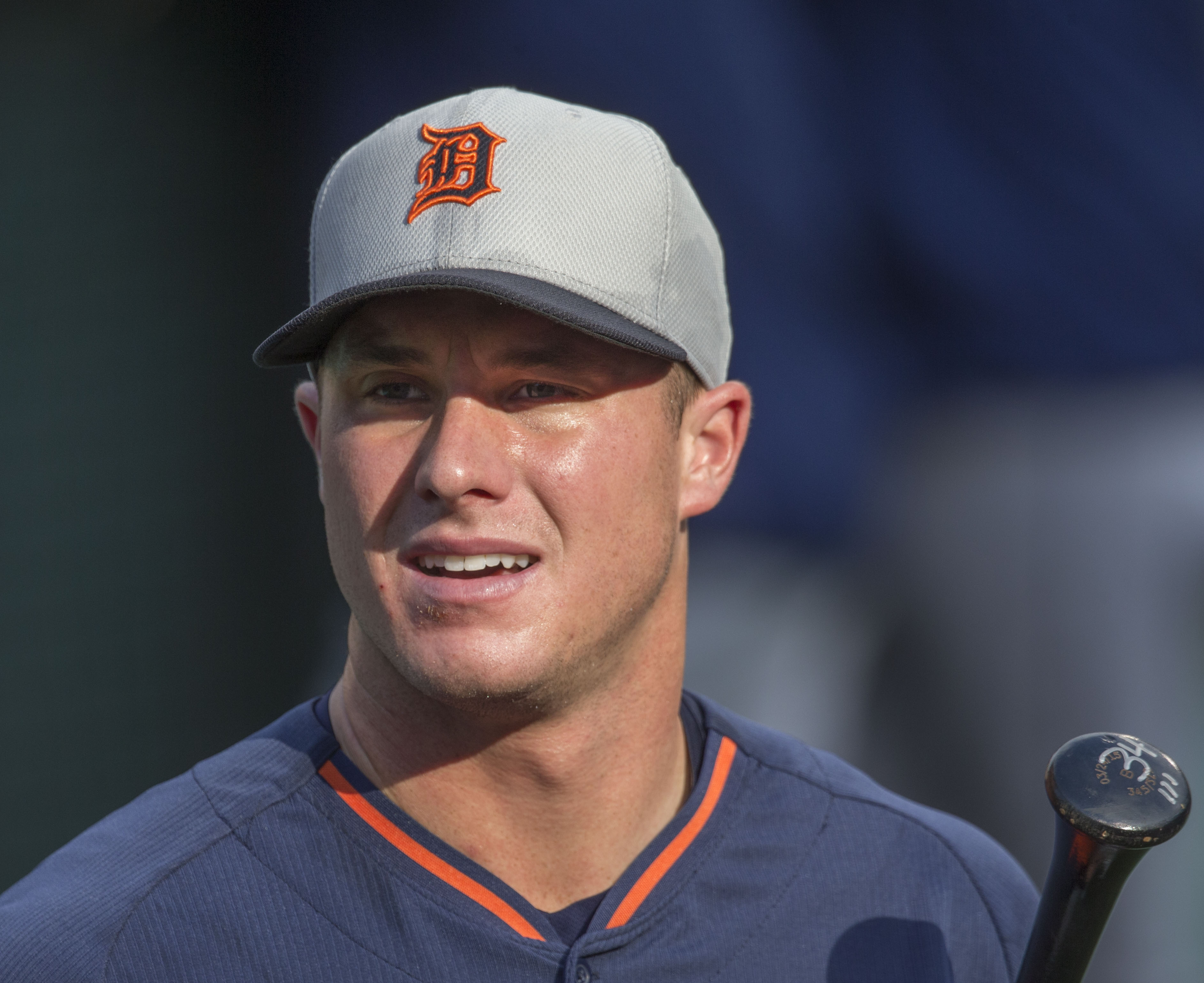
2010 Kettleer James McCann

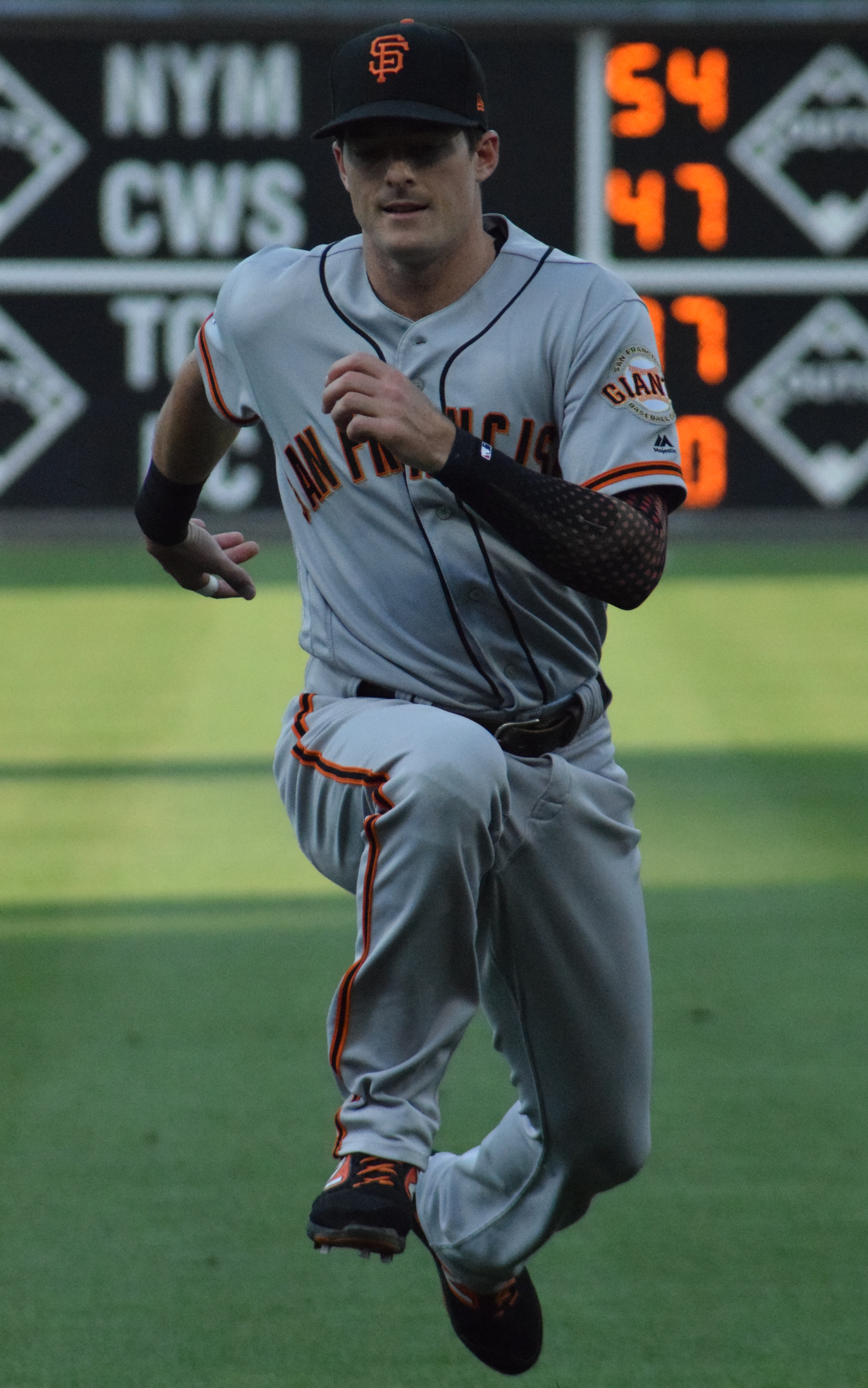
Mike Yastrzemski played two seasons at Cotuit and won a CCBL championship in 2010

=== Results by season, 1947–1962 ===
Year	Won	Lost	Regular Season Finish*	Postseason	Manager	Ref
1947	10	10			Victor Robello	
1948	12	16			Victor Robello	
1949	26	8		Lost semi-finals (Falmouth)	Roger Scudder	
1950	23	8	4th Upper Cape Division (A); 1st Upper Cape Division (B)	Lost semi-finals (Sagamore)	Roger Scudder	
1951	12	20	7th Upper Cape Division (A); 5th Upper Cape Division (B)		Roger Scudder	
1952	16	13			Roger Scudder	
1953	21	15	T-3rd Upper Cape Division (A); 2nd Upper Cape Division (B)		Ed Bearse	
1954	17	14		Lost semi-finals (Sagamore)	Paul Thomas	
1955	27	12		Won semi-finals (Sagamore); Lost championship (Orleans)	Cal Burlingame	
1956	24	11	1st Upper Cape Division	Won round 1 (Mass. Maritime); Lost semi-finals (Sagamore)	Jim Perkins	
1957	23	8	1st Upper Cape Division	Won round 1 (Sagamore); Lost semi-finals (Wareham)	Jim Perkins	
1958	13	12	4th Upper Cape Division (A); 2nd Upper Cape Division (B)		Paul Thomas	
1959	12	18	3rd Upper Cape Division (A); 7th Upper Cape Division (B)		Paul Thomas	
1960	21	7	2nd Upper Cape Division	Won round 1 (Wareham); Lost semi-finals (Sagamore)	Gene Savard	
1961	24	4	1st Upper Cape Division	Won round 1 (Barnstable); Won semi-finals (Falmouth); Won championship (Yarmouth)	Jim Hubbard	
1962	25	5	1st Upper Cape Division	Won round 1 (Bourne); Won semi-finals (Sagamore); Won championship (Harwich)	Jim Hubbard	

* Regular seasons split into first and second halves are designated as (A) and (B).

=== Results by season, 1963–present ===
Year	Won	Lost	Tied	Regular Season Finish	Postseason	Manager	MVP
1963	28	4	0	1st Upper Cape Division	Won semi-finals (Wareham); Won championship (Orleans)	Jim Hubbard	Jack McCarthy
1964	31	3	0	1st Upper Cape Division	Won championship (Chatham)	Jim Hubbard	Ken Huebner
1965	15	16	0	3rd Upper Cape Division		Jim Hubbard	Bob Butkus
1966	14	22	0	3rd Upper Cape Division		Jim Hubbard	Tom Kelly
1967	22	16	0	2nd Upper Cape Division	Lost semi-finals (Falmouth)	Jim Hubbard	Tom Kelly
1968	16	24	0	4th Upper Cape Division		Jim Hubbard	Peter Krull
1969	21	22	2	2nd Upper Cape Division	Lost semi-finals (Falmouth)	Jim Hubbard	Nick Furlong
1970	23	19	0	4th League	Lost semi-finals (Falmouth)	Jack McCarthy	Natale Calamis
1971	20	18	4	4th League	Lost semi-finals (Falmouth)	Jack McCarthy	Don Douglas
1972	26	15	1	1st League (T)	Won semi-finals (Falmouth); Won championship (Chatham)	Jack McCarthy	Joe Zylka
1973	24	17	0	2nd League	Won semi-finals (Wareham); Won championship (Yarmouth)	Jack McCarthy	Gene Quirk; Danny Goodwin
1974	20	19	3	4th League	Won semi-finals (Wareham); Won championship (Orleans)	Jack McCarthy	Jim Thomas
1975	24	18	0	3rd League	Won semi-finals (Orleans); Won championship (Falmouth)	Jack McCarthy	Paul O'Neill
1976	25	12	5	2nd League	Lost semi-finals (Wareham)	Jack McCarthy	Al Weston
1977	27	13	2	1st League	Won semi-finals (Wareham); Won championship (Y-D)	Jack McCarthy	Del Bender
1978	19	22	1	6th League		Jack McCarthy	Randy LaVigne
1979	23	27	2	2nd League	Lost semi-finals (Harwich)	George Greer	Tim Teufel
1980	25	15	2	3rd League	Lost semi-finals (Falmouth)	George Greer	Ron Darling
1981	19	18	5	4th League	Won semi-finals (Wareham); Won championship (Orleans)	George Greer	Billy Dees
1982	24	16	2	2nd League	Lost semi-finals (Hyannis)	George Greer	Terry Steinbach
1983	27	11	3	1st League	Won semi-finals (Hyannis); Lost championship (Harwich)	George Greer	Greg Lotzar
1984	22	16	4	3rd League	Won semi-finals (Orleans); Won championship (Wareham)	George Greer	Stu Weidie
1985	28	14	0	2nd League	Won semi-finals (Harwich); Won championship (Chatham)	George Greer	Greg Vaughn
1986	23	18	1	2nd League	Won semi-finals (Wareham); Lost championship (Orleans)	George Greer	Cris Carpenter
1987	22	18	2	4th League	Lost semi-finals (Harwich)	George Greer	Billy Masse
1988	21	18	5	3rd West Division		Pete Varney	David Krol
1989	23	20	1	3rd West Division		Pete Varney	J. R. Showalter
1990	22	19	2	2nd West Division	Lost semi-finals (Wareham)	Pete Varney	Ray Suplee
1991	21	21	2	3rd West Division		Roger Bidwell	Chris Widger
1992	28	14	1	1st West Division	Won semi-finals (Wareham); Lost championship (Chatham)	Roger Bidwell	John Kelly
1993	24	20	0	3rd West Division		Roger Bidwell	Ray Ricken
1994	20	21	2	4th West Division		Roger Bidwell	Joe Funaro
1995	29	11	3	1st West Division	Won semi-finals (Wareham); Won championship (Chatham)	Mike Coutts	Josh Paul
1996	23	19	2	3rd West Division		Mike Coutts	Jack Cressend
1997	21	21	2	4th West Division		Tom Walter	John Scheschuk
1998	18	22	4	5th West Division		Tom Walter	Jeff Heaverlo
1999	26	18	0	1st West Division	Won semi-finals (Wareham); Won championship (Chatham)	Mike Coutts	Garrett Atkins; Rich Thompson
2000	17	26	0	4th West Division		Mike Coutts	Nick Glazer
2001	20	20	4	4th West Division		Mike Coutts	Brent Metheny
2002	23	16	5	1st West Division	Lost semi-finals (Wareham)	Garrett Quinn	Pete Stonard
2003	20	21	2	3rd West Division		Garrett Quinn	Eric Nielsen
2004	20	23	1	3rd West Division		Mike Roberts	Chase Headley
2005	22	19	3	2nd West Division	Lost semi-finals (Bourne)	Mike Roberts	Sean Gaston
2006	27	16	1	1st West Division	Lost semi-finals (Wareham)	Mike Roberts	Justin Smoak; Eric Farris
2007	14	27	3	5th West Division		Mike Roberts	Reese Havens
2008	24	18	2	1st West Division	Won semi-finals (Falmouth); Lost championship (Harwich)	Mike Roberts	Kevin Patterson
2009	20	18	6	2nd West Division	Won play-in game (Wareham); Won semi-finals (Y-D); Lost championship (Bourne)	Mike Roberts	Zack Cox
2010	19	23	2	3rd West Division	Won round 1 (Falmouth); Won semi-finals (Wareham); Won championship (Y-D)	Mike Roberts	Jordan Leyland
2011	16	25	3	5th West Division		Mike Roberts	Victor Roache
2012	30	14	0	1st West Division	Lost round 1 (Bourne)	Mike Roberts	Patrick Biondi
2013	25	18	1	3rd West Division	Won round 1 (Falmouth); Won semi-finals (Bourne); Won championship (Orleans)	Mike Roberts	Rhett Wiseman
2014	18	25	1	4th West Division	Won round 1 (Bourne); Lost semi-finals (Falmouth)	Mike Roberts	Logan Taylor
2015	17	27	0	4th West Division	Lost round 1 (Hyannis)	Mike Roberts	Michael Paez
2016	15	28	1	5th West Division		Mike Roberts	Quinn Brodey
2017	22	21	1	2nd West Division	Lost round 1 (Bourne)	Mike Roberts	Griffin Conine
2018	22	18	4	4th West Division	Lost round 1 (Wareham)	Mike Roberts	Michael Toglia
2019	20	20	4	3rd West Division	Won round 1 (Wareham); Won semi-finals (Falmouth); Won championship (Harwich)	Mike Roberts	Nick Gonzales
2020	Season cancelled due to coronavirus pandemic						
2021	18	17	1	2nd West Division	Lost semi-finals (Bourne)	Mike Roberts	Ryan Ritter
2022	23	16	5	2nd West Division	Lost round 1 (Hyannis)	Mike Roberts	Tommy Troy
2023	28	15	1	1st West Division	Lost round 1 (Bourne)	Mike Roberts	Cole Mathis
2024	22	17	1	2nd West Division (T)	Won round 1 (Wareham); Lost semi-finals (Bourne)	Mike Roberts	Tanner Thach
2025	17	20	3	3rd West Division	Won round 1 (Wareham); Lost semi-finals (Bourne)	Loren Hibbs	
2026	13	25	2	4th West Division	Lost round 1 (Hyannis)	Rob Cooper	

== League award winners ==
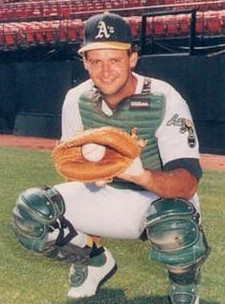
CCBL Hall of Famer Terry Steinbach was league MVP and batting champ for Cotuit in 1982.

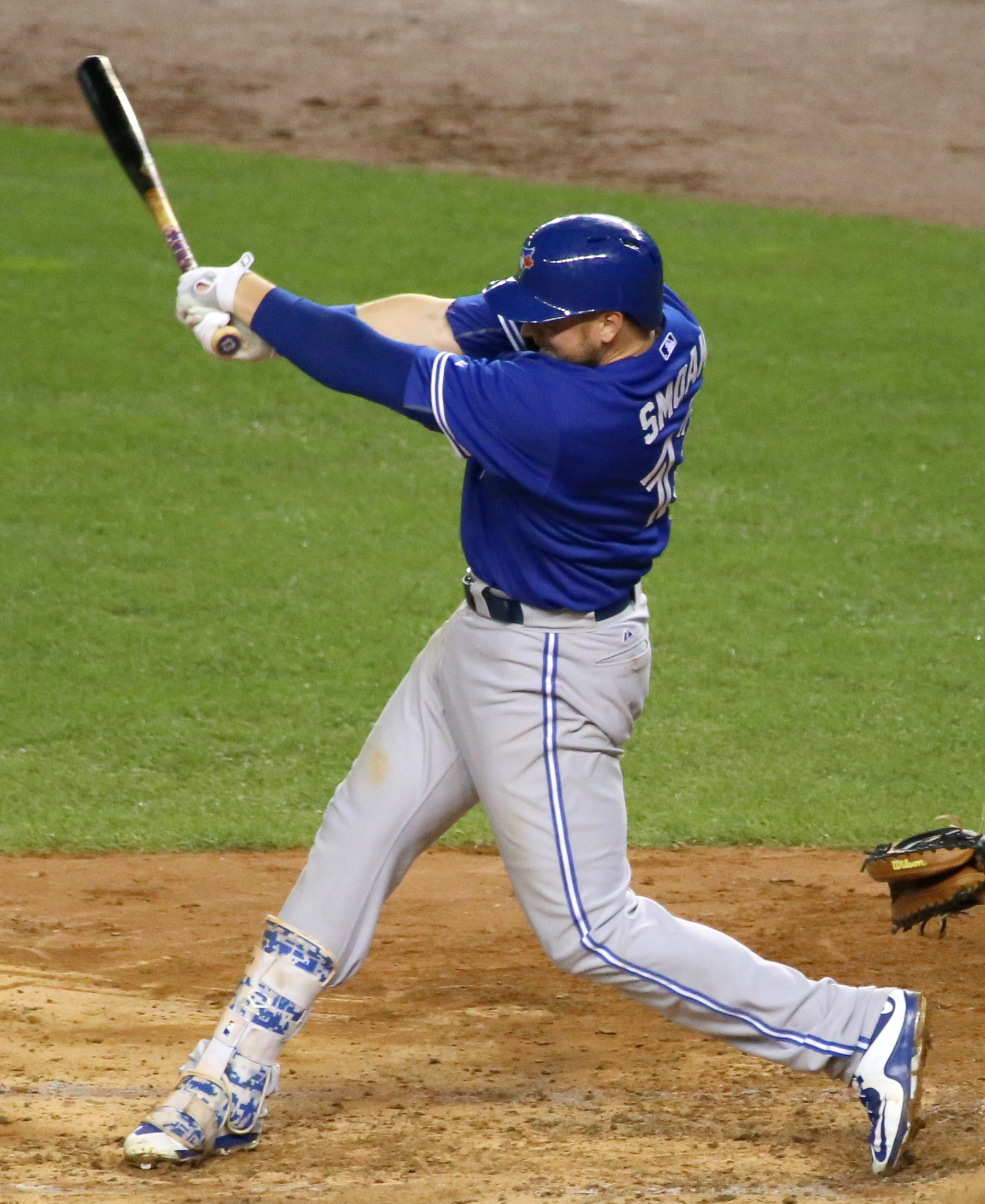
CCBL Hall of Famer Justin Smoak, 2006 CCBL MVP

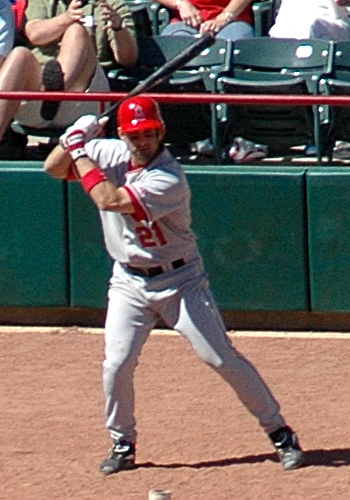
Lou Merloni wore the CCBL batting crown in 1992, and also took home the league Sportsmanship Award

The Pat Sorenti MVP Award
Year	Player
1964	Ken Huebner
1975	Paul O'Neill
1980	Ron Darling
1982	Terry Steinbach
1983	Greg Lotzar
1985	Greg Vaughn
1992	Rick Ellstrom
1995	Josh Paul
2002	Pete Stonard
2006	Justin Smoak
2017	Greyson Jenista
2019	Nick Gonzales

The Robert A. McNeece Outstanding Pro Prospect Award
Year	Player
1977	Brian Denman*
1980	Ron Darling
1985	John Ramos
1986	Cris Carpenter
1995	Josh Paul
2011	Victor Roache
2017	Griffin Conine
2022	Tommy Troy
2025	Jarren Advincula

The BFC Whitehouse Outstanding Pitcher Award
Year	Player
1964	Bernie Kilroy
1980	Joe Pursell
1989	Mike Hostetler
1992	John Kelly
1998	Jeff Heaverlo*
2023	Camron Hill

The Russ Ford Outstanding Relief Pitcher Award
Year	Player
1995	Brendan Sullivan
1997	Chris Aronson
2012	Dan Slania
2014	Adam Whitt*
2022	Cam Schuelke

The Daniel J. Silva Sportsmanship Award
Year	Player
1978	Randy LaVigne*
1982	Jeff Innis
1984	Tom Hildebrand
1992	Lou Merloni
2001	Bill Peavey
2008	Kevin Patterson
2015	Will Haynie
2024	Tanner Thach

The Manny Robello 10th Player Award
Year	Player
1990	Chris Demetral
1999	James Ramshaw

The John J. Claffey Outstanding New England Player Award
Year	Player
2021	Matt Donlan

The Thurman Munson Award for Batting Champion
Year	Player
1975	Paul O'Neill (.358)
1977	Del Bender (.395)
1978	Randy LaVigne (.370)
1982	Terry Steinbach (.431)
1983	Greg Lotzar (.414)
1992	Lou Merloni (.321)
1995	Josh Paul (.364)
2002	Pete Stonard (.348)
2012	Patrick Biondi (.388)
2024	Jarren Advincula (.392)

All-Star Game MVP Award
Year	Player
1980	Ron Darling
1988	J.T. Bruett
1992	Rick Ellstrom
1994	Boomer Whipple
1998	Todd Donovan
1999	Garrett Atkins
2002	Brian Snyder
2009	Zack Cox
2017	Griffin Conine

All-Star Home Run Hitting Contest Champion
Year	Player
1993	Scott Krause
1997	John Scheschuk
2010	Paul Hoilman
2026	Brady Christman

The Star of Stars Playoff MVP Award
Year	Player
1985	Grady Hall
1995	Josh Paul*
1995	Josh Gandy*
1999	Garrett Atkins
2010	Jordan Leyland
2013	Bradley Zimmer
2019	Casey Schmitt

(*) - Indicates co-recipient

== All-Star Game selections ==
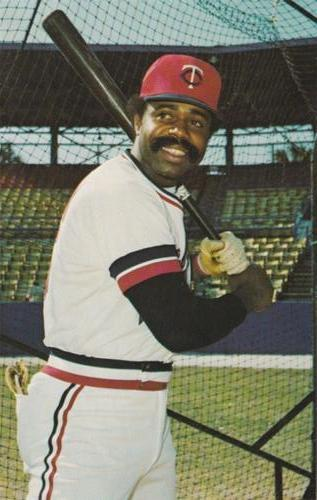
1973 Kettleer all-star Danny Goodwin was the first overall pick in the 1975 MLB draft

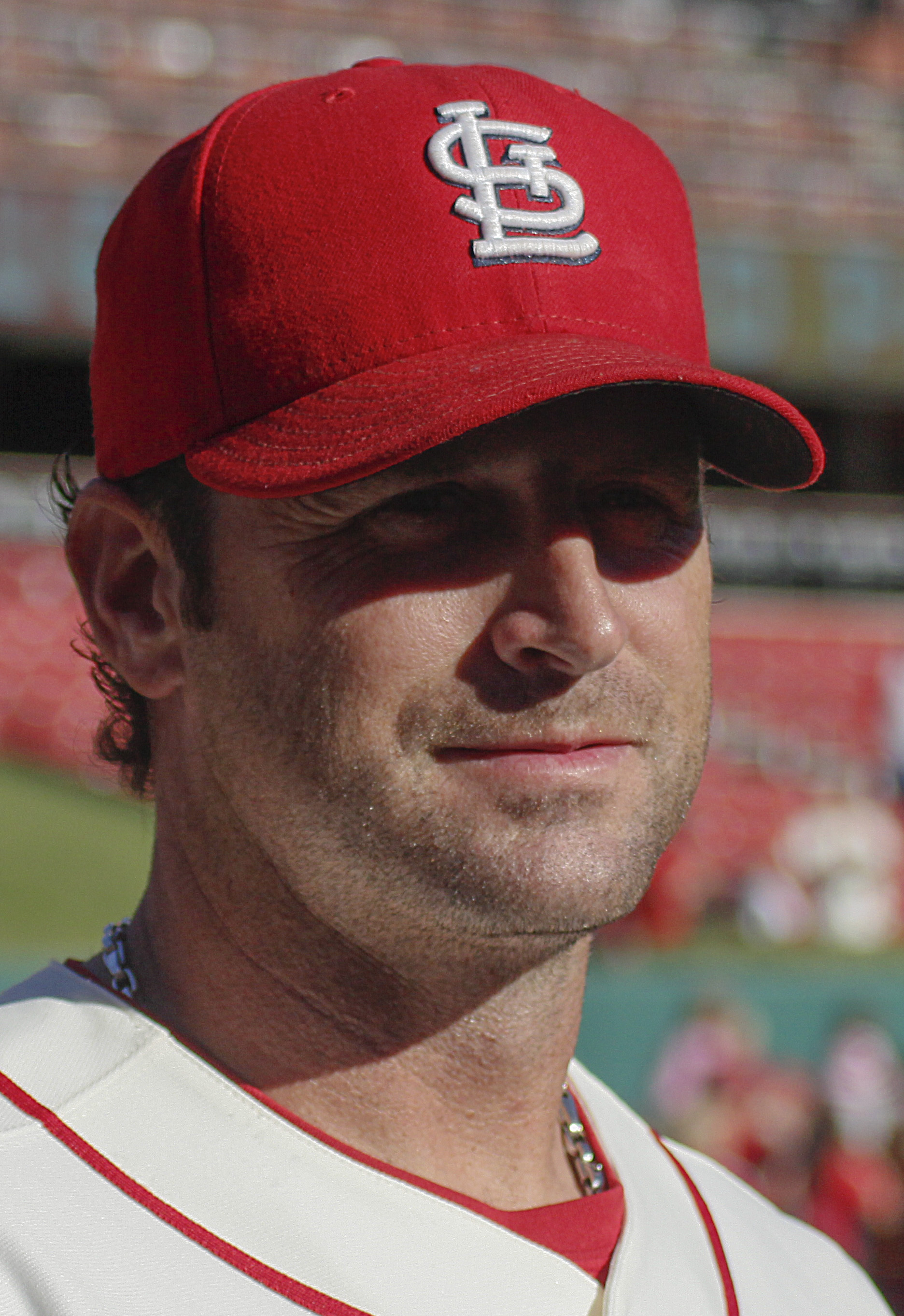
Mike Matheny was an all-star for Cotuit in 1990.

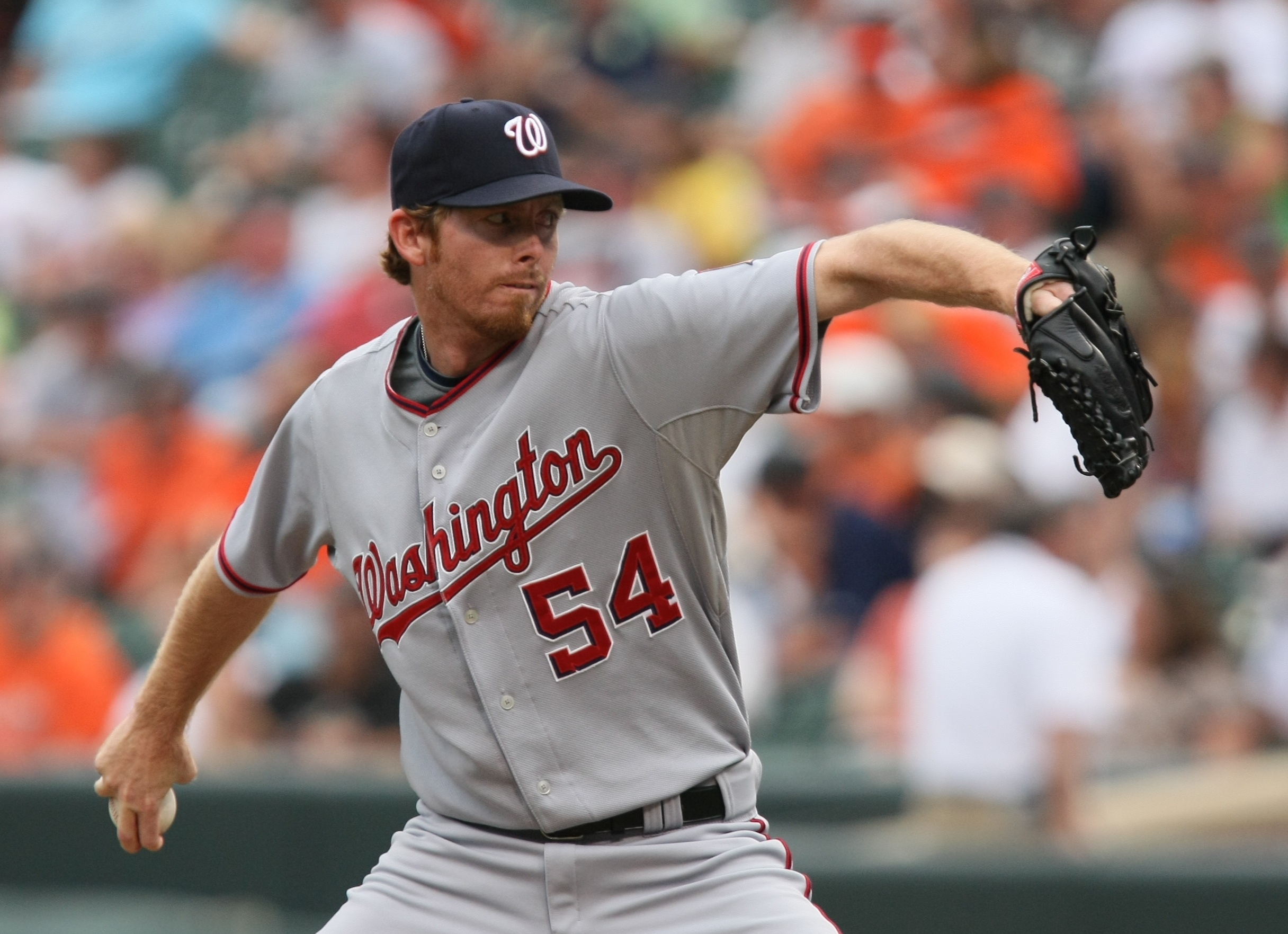
1997 Cotuit all-star Mike MacDougal

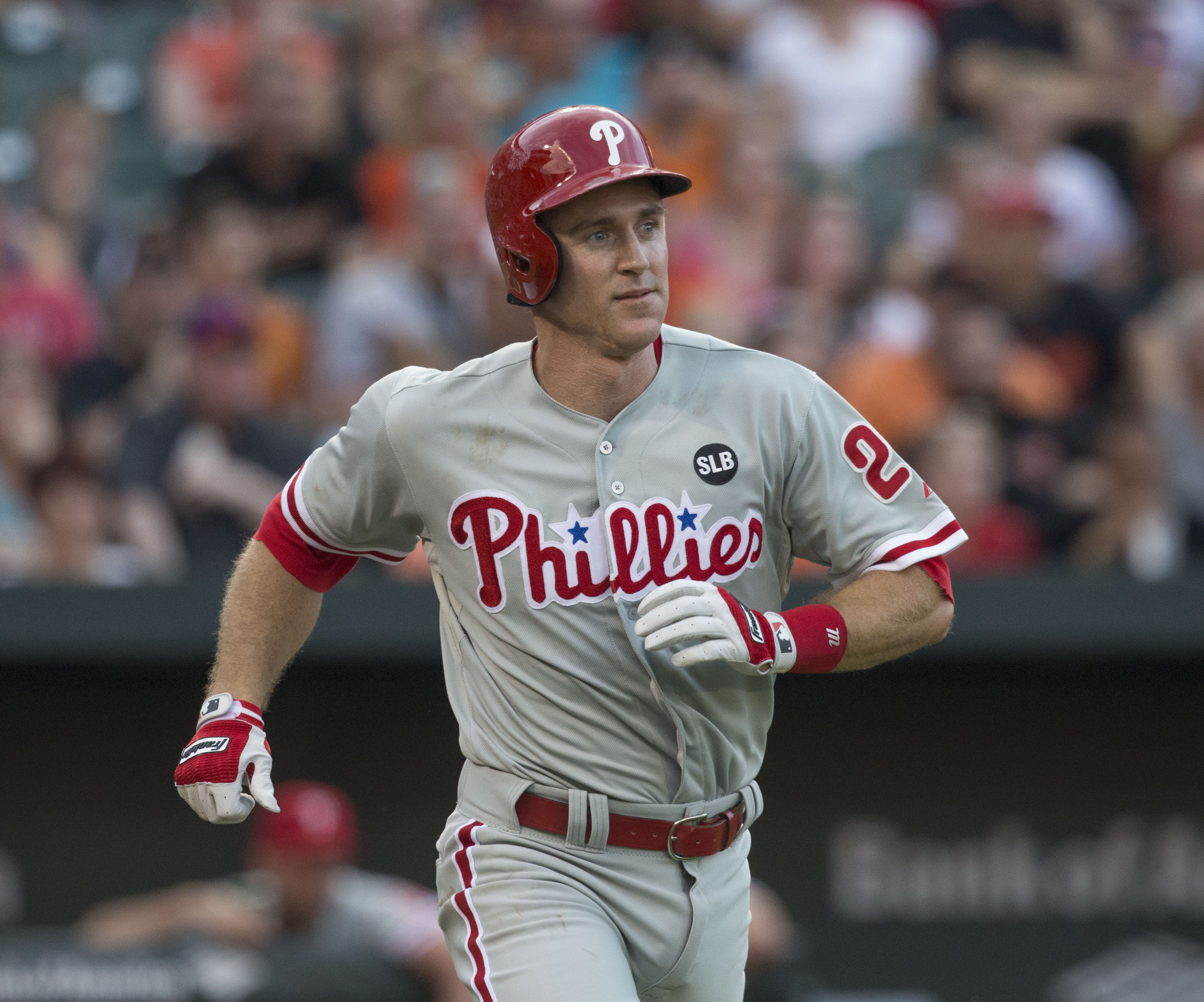
CCBL all-star second baseman Chase Utley of the 1999 league champion Kettleers

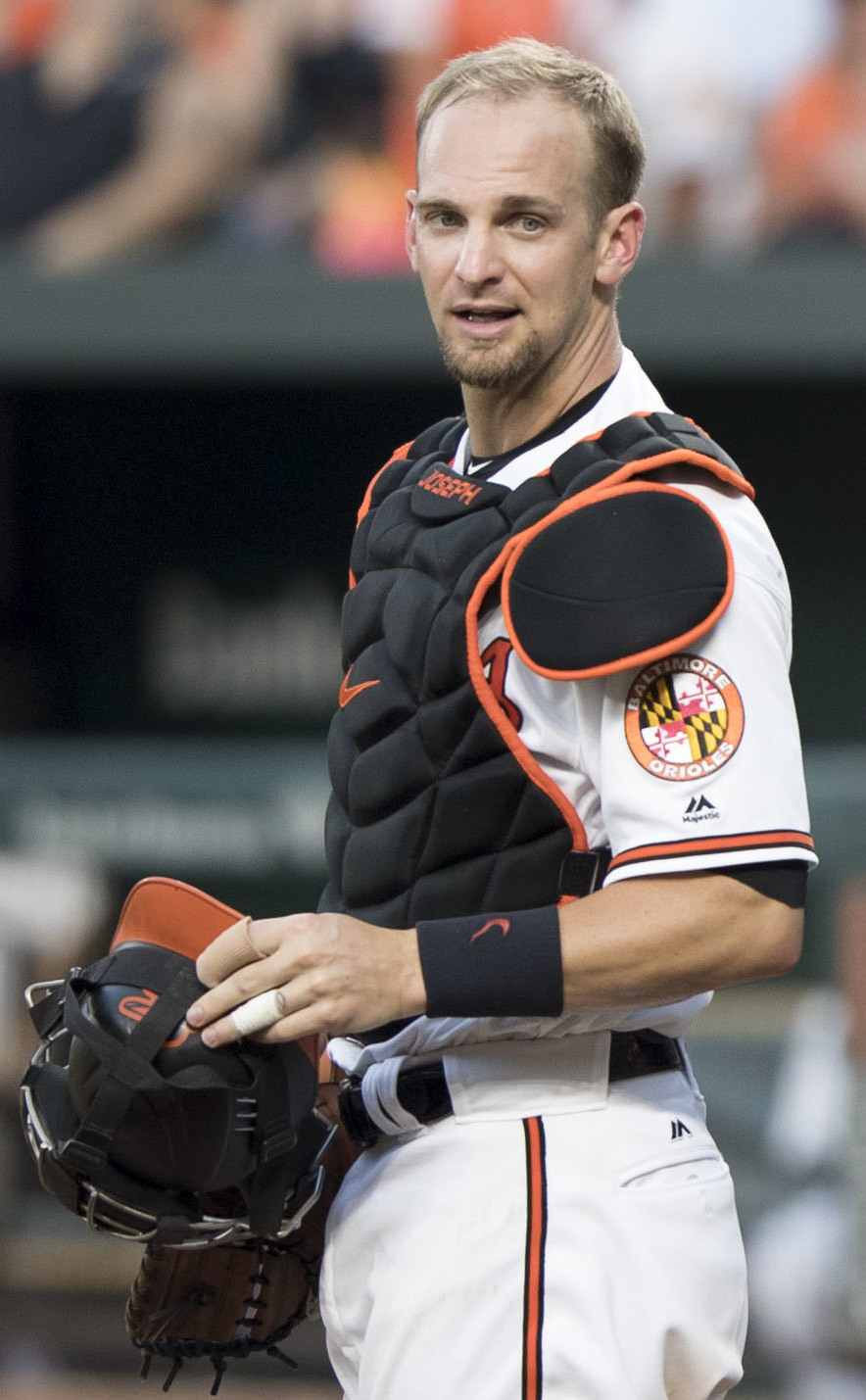
2007 Kettleer all-star Caleb Joseph

Year	Players	Ref
1963	Bob Butkus, Bernie Kilroy, Joe Russo, Dick Mayo, Connie Deneault, Stan Sikorsky, Cotton Nash, Dutch Schultz	
1964	Bob Butkus, Bernie Kilroy, Joe Russo, Keith Weber, Jack McCarthy, Reinhard Griesmer, Matt Galante, Ken Huebner, Richard McAvoy	
1965	Bob Butkus, Dick Mayo, Tom Kelly, Raymond Ilg, Ken Martin	
1966	Bernie Kilroy, Tom Kelly, Nick Furlong, Jim McMahon	
1967	Bob Hansen, Nick Furlong, Tom Kelly, Doug Smith, Robert McKenney, Ken Hill, Stephen Vaughn	
1968	Bob Hansen, Vin Adimando, Glen Pickren, Ron Soucie	
1969	Nick Furlong, Vin Adimando, Bill McCleave, Kevin Cronin	
1970	Brian Sheekey, Jerry Tekulve, Phil Krill, Tom Henner	
1971	Rick Burley	
1972	Joe Zylka, Tim Sherrill, Ed McMahon, Don Douglas	
1973	Joe Zylka, Danny Goodwin, Dale Brock, Ken Herbst	
1974	Jim Thomas, Bob Hampton	
1975	Paul O'Neill, Barry Butera, Steve Kesses, Duane Gustavson, Joe Beckwith	
1976	Al Weston	
1977	Del Bender, Joe Rietano, Mike Lusardi, Brian Denman	
1978	Randy Lavigne, Brian Butera, Tom Heckman	
1979	Dave Miller, Tim Teufel	
1980	Dave Miller, Gary Jost, Ron Darling, Randy Meier, Joe Pursell	
1981	Don Swearingen	
1982	Bruce Crabbe, Terry Steinbach, Bill Piwnica	
1983	Bruce Crabbe, Will Clark, Greg Lotzar, Chris Boyle, Gregg Barrios, Barry Jones	
1984	Grady Hall, Joe Girardi, Stuart Weidie	
1985	Rubén Amaro Jr., Grady Hall, Bill Masse, Greg Vaughn, John Ramos	
1986	Rubén Amaro Jr., Tom Ard, Cris Carpenter, Tony Ariola	
1987	Bill Masse, Roger Miller, Frank Carey, Jerry Brooks	
1988	J. T. Bruett, David Krol	
1989	Doug MacNeil, Tom Eason, J. R. Showalter, Mike Hostetler, Phil Dauphin, David McCarty	
1990	Doug MacNeil, Mike Matheny, Chris Sheff, Brian Seguin, Ray Suplee, Russ Brock	
1991	Greg Thomas, Todd Marion, Chris Widger	
1992	Rick Ellstrom, Lou Merloni, Steve DeFranco, John Kelly, Jermaine Allensworth, Tim Kubinski, Robert Linfante, Greg Thomas	
1993	Ray Ricken, Mike Saipe, Scott Krause	
1994	Joe Funaro, Boomer Whipple, Jason Bell, Steve Hacker	
1995	Jack Cressend, Tim DeCinces, Jesse Zepeda, Kevin Sheredy, Mike Ramseyer, Josh Gandy, Josh Paul	
1996	Jack Cressend, Glenn Davis, Jon Schaeffer, Giuseppe Chiaramonte	
1997	Robb Quinlan, Bart Miadich, Mike MacDougal, John Scheschuk	
1998	Garrett Atkins, Todd Donovan, Andy Kropf, Jeff Heaverlo, Pat Magness	
1999	Garrett Atkins, Chase Utley, Shawn Pearson, Rich Thompson, Brad Stockton, Henry Bonilla, James Ramshaw, Mike Schultz	
2000	Ryan Combs, Nick Glaser, Daylan Holt	
2001	Chris O'Riordan, Kyle Sleeth	
2002	Brian Ingram, Brian Snyder, Pete Stonard, Adam Hanson, Josh Banks, Lee Mitchell	
2003	John Hardy, Eric Nielson, Clint Sammons, Garry Bakker, Josh Deel	
2004	Bryan Harris, Geoff Strickland, Nathan Emrick	
2005	Bryan Harris, Sean Gaston, Jason Donald, Chris Toneguzzi, Brad Boyer	
2006	Reese Havens, Sean Gaston, Eric Farris, Jeffrey Rea, James Simmons, Jay Brown, Cory Gearrin, Justin Smoak	
2007	Reese Havens, Robert Stock, Caleb Joseph, Josh Lindblom	
2008	Kevin Patterson, Seth Blair	
2009	Cody Stanley, Zack Cox, Zach Cone, Cameron Rupp, Daniel Tillman, Kevin Patterson	
2010	Chad Wright, Jordan Leyland, Austin Wood, A. J. Achter, Paul Hoilman	
2011	Chris Beck, Bobby Wahl, Victor Roache	
2012	Patrick Biondi, Jacob May, Dan Slania	
2013	Jake Fincher, Rhett Wiseman, Patrick Corbett, Jared Walsh, Yale Rosen	
2014	Jake Fincher, Adam Whitt, John Norwood, Tres Barrera	
2015	Michael Paez, Jackson Klein, Jon Woodcock, Will Haynie	
2016	Quinn Brodey, Eddie Muhl	
2017	Griffin Conine, Zach Kone, Zane Collins, Justin Hopper, Greyson Jenista	
2018	Zach Biermann, Zach Humphreys, Stephen Schoch	
2019	Nick Gonzales, Allbry Major, Reid Johnston, Matt Moore, Cody Pasic, Casey Schmitt, Parker Chavers, Matt Mervis, Oraj Anu	
2020	Season cancelled due to coronavirus pandemic	
2021	Luke Gold, Eric Brown, Jake Brooks	
2022	Caleb Lomavita, Harrison Cohen, Ben Johnson, Tyler Johnson, Tommy Troy	
2023	Caleb Lomavita, Jake Gigliotti, Camron Hill, Cole Mathis, Carter Mathison	
2024	Jarren Advincula, Brandon Compton, Michael Ebner, Tanner Thach	
2025	Jarren Advincula, Ryne Farber, Payton Manca, Jack Natili	
2026	Landon Beaver, Noah Coy, Jesse DiMaggio, Truitt Manuel, JJ Moran, Dawson Park, Chase Van Ameyda, Brady Christman	

Italics - Indicates All-Star Game Home Run Hitting Contest participant (1988 to present)

== No-hit games ==
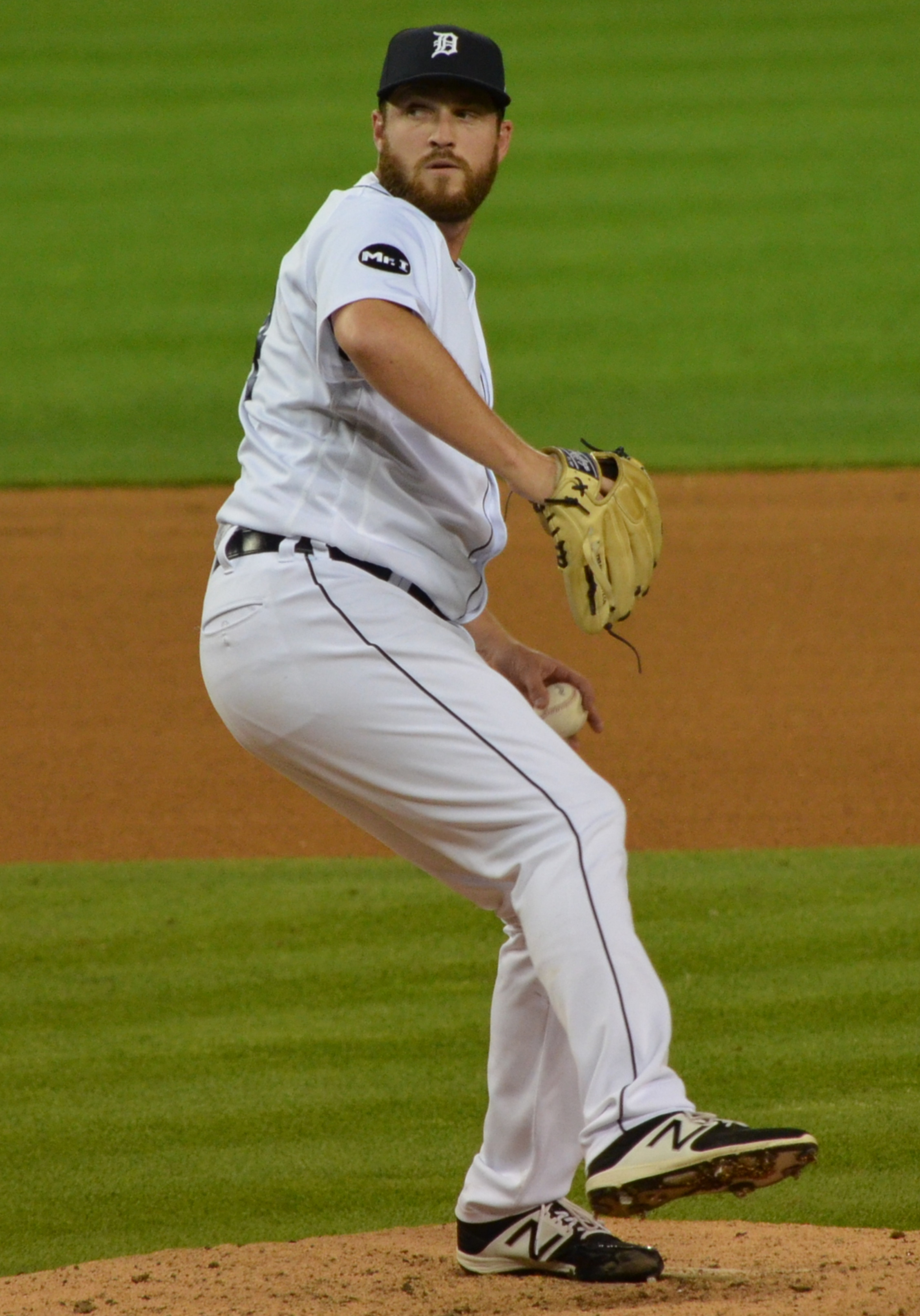
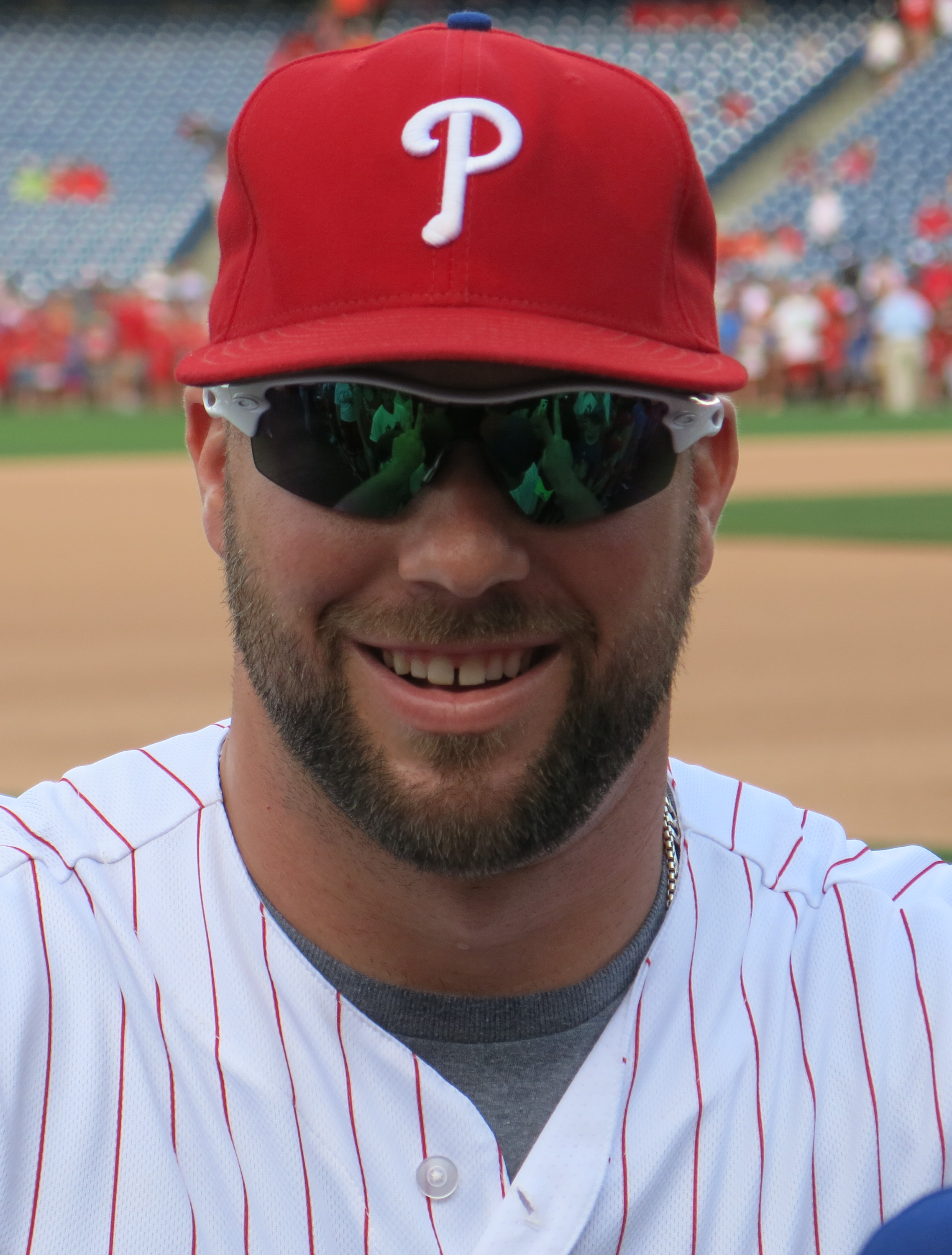
The Kettleer battery of Chad Bell and Cameron Rupp no-hit Chatham in 2009.

Year	Pitcher	Opponent	Score	Location	Notes	Ref
1951	Ron Roth	Falmouth (Falcons)	4–0	Central Park Field		
1961	Bernie Kilroy	Maritime	12–0	Massachusetts Maritime Academy		
1963	Bob Butkus	Wareham	0–0	Clem Spillane Field	7-inning game; Tie game	
1967	Jim Courier	Falmouth	6–1	Lowell Park		
1967	Doug Smith	Wareham	8–1	Clem Spillane Field		
1968	Ron Soucie	Bourne	1–2	Keith Field	Lost game	
1969	Ed Szado	Bourne	5–0	Keith Field		
1971	Rick Burley	Harwich	2–0	Lowell Park		
1987	Dave Fitzgerald	Harwich	6–0	Lowell Park		
1996	Josh Gandy	Wareham	1–0	Lowell Park		
2002	Joe Little	Chatham	9–1	Lowell Park	Combined	
2002	Jarred Stuart	Chatham	9–1	Lowell Park	Combined	
2002	Kevin Ool	Chatham	9–1	Lowell Park	Combined	
2002	Josh Banks	Chatham	9–1	Lowell Park	Combined	
2009	Chad Bell	Chatham	8–2	Veterans Field	Caught by Cameron Rupp	

== Managerial history ==
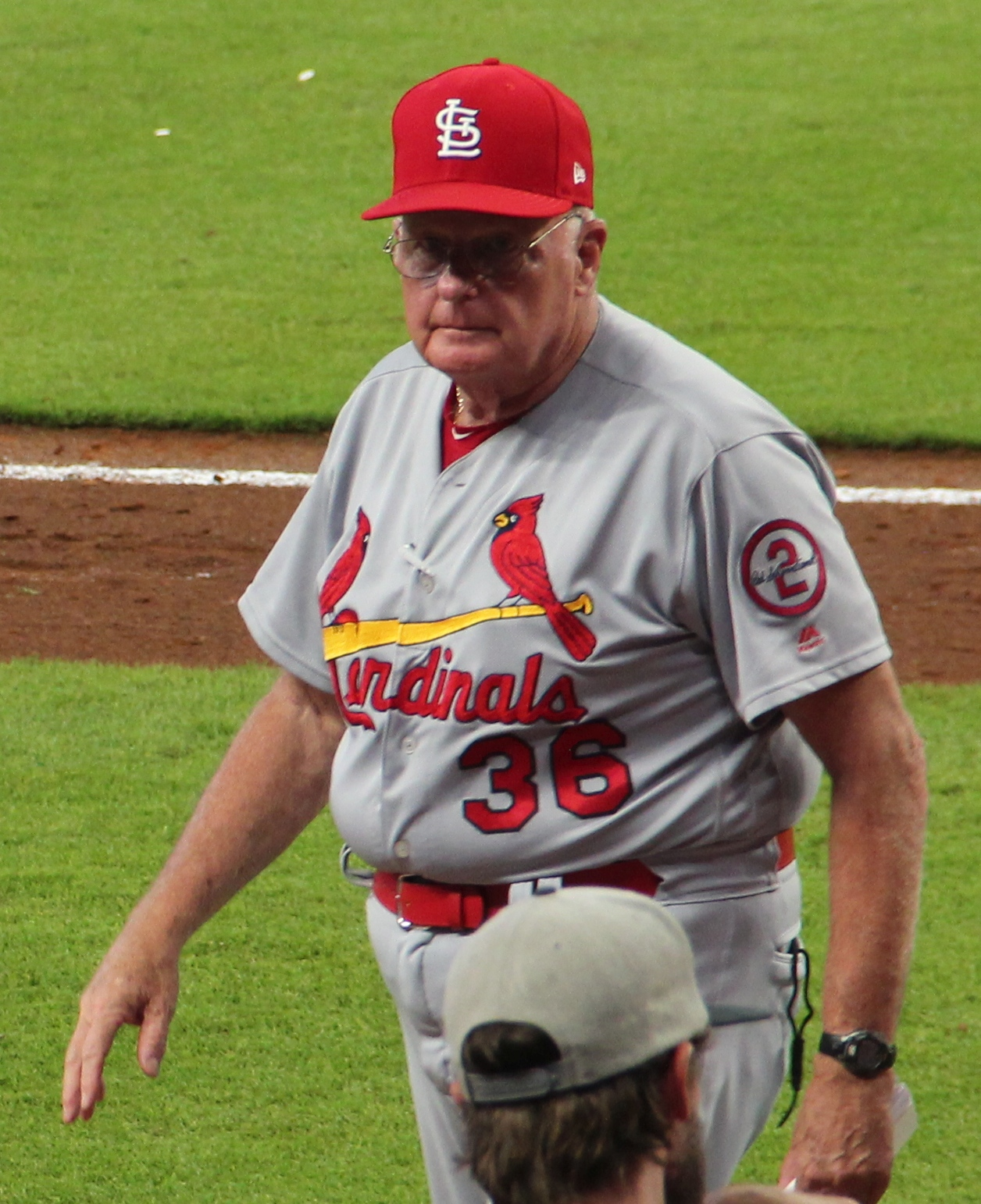
CCBL Hall of Famer George Greer skippered the Kettleers to three league titles in the 1980s

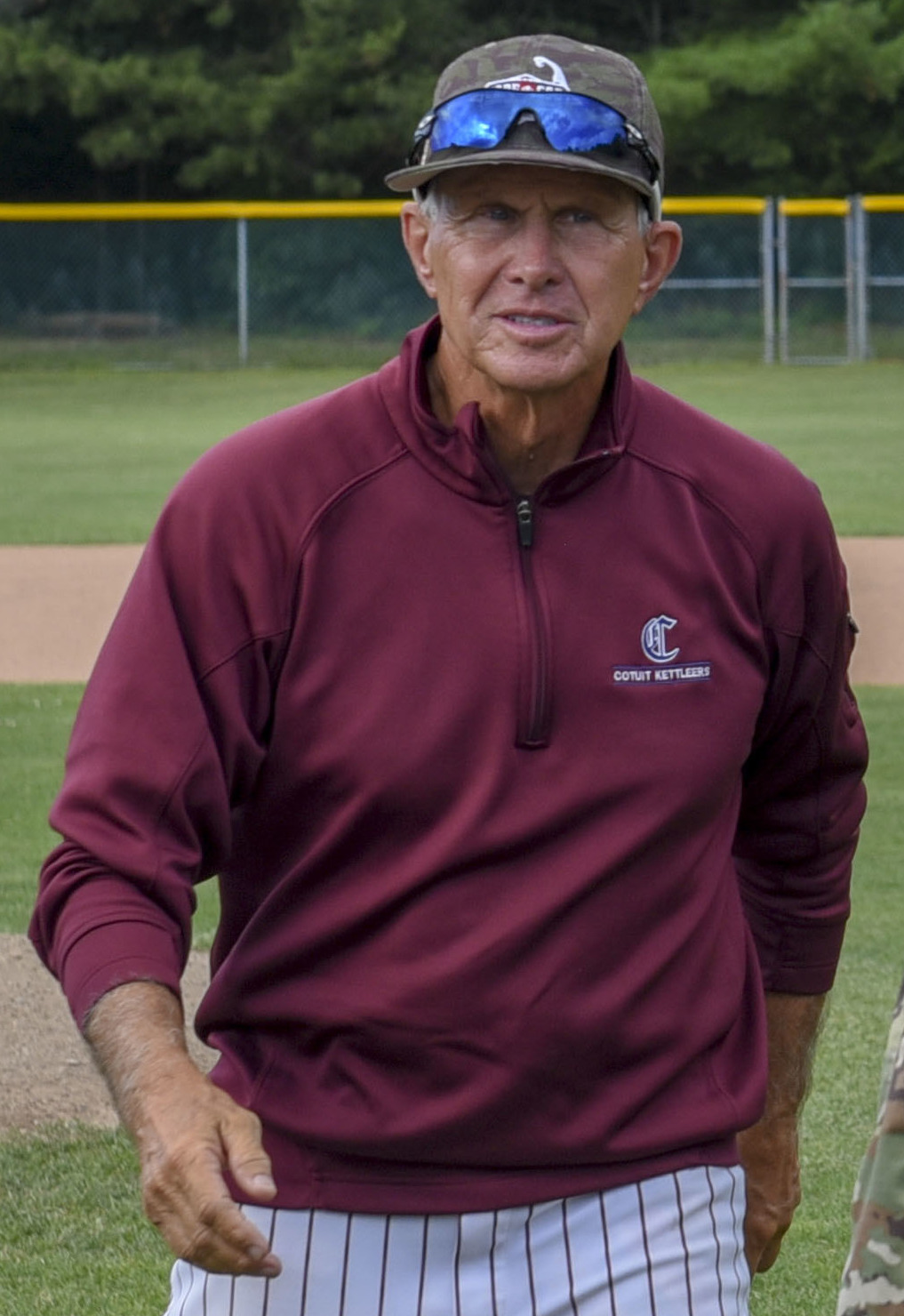
Longtime Kettleer manager Mike Roberts

Manager	Seasons	Total Seasons	Championship Seasons
Victor Robello	1947–1948	2	
Roger Scudder	1949–1952	4	
Ed Bearse	1953	1	
Paul Thomas	1954; 1958–1959	3	
Cal Burlingame	1955	1	
Jim Perkins	1956–1957	2	
Gene Savard	1960	1	
Jim Hubbard	1961–1969	9	1961, 1962, 1963, 1964
Jack McCarthy	1970–1978	9	1972, 1973, 1974, 1975, 1977
George Greer	1979–1987	9	1981, 1984, 1985
Pete Varney	1988–1990	3	
Roger Bidwell	1991–1994	4	
Mike Coutts	1995–1996; 1999–2001	5	1995, 1999
Tom Walter	1997–1998	2	
Garrett Quinn	2002–2003	2	
Mike Roberts	2004–2024	20*	2010, 2013, 2019
Loren Hibbs	2025	1	
Rob Cooper	2026	1	

(*) - Season count excludes 2020 CCBL season cancelled due to coronavirus pandemic.

== See also ==
- Cotuit Kettleers players
