= Rick Huisman =

American baseball player (born 1969)

- Pitcher
- Born: May 17, 1969 (age 56); Oak Lawn, Illinois, U.S.
- Batted: Right Threw: Right

MLB debut
- September 4, 1995, for the Kansas City Royals

Last MLB appearance
- September 28, 1996, for the Kansas City Royals

MLB statistics
- Games pitched: 29
- Win–loss record: 2–1
- Earned run average: 5.31
- Strikeouts: 35
- Stats at Baseball Reference

Teams
- Kansas City Royals (1995–1996)

Richard Allen Huisman (born May 17, 1969) is an American former Major League Baseball (MLB) pitcher who played for the Kansas City Royals in 1995 and 1996.

== Amateur career ==
Huisman attended Timothy Christian High School in Elmhurst, Illinois and graduated in 1987. He also played baseball at Lewis University. In 1989, he played collegiate summer baseball with the Chatham A's of the Cape Cod Baseball League and was named a league all-star.

== Professional career ==
Huisman was drafted by the San Francisco Giants in the third round of the 1990 MLB draft and signed a contract on June 11 of that year. In 1993, he was selected off waivers by the Houston Astros. Two years later, he was traded to the Kansas City Royals for Pat Borders.

Huisman pitched in a total of 29 games in the Major Leagues over two seasons with the Royals; his record was two wins and one loss. Huisman's earned run average was 4.89. On August 12, 1996, Huisman pitched 3 innings to close out a 10-4 Royals victory over the Mariners. Preserving the win for Kevin Appier, it was Husiman's only major league save. His final game was played on September 28, 1996.

== Personal ==
In May 2012, Huisman became the Executive Director of The Boys & Girls Clubs of Grand Rapids Youth Commonwealth.
