= Chatham Anglers =

Collegiate summer baseball team in Massachusetts

Information
- League: Cape Cod Baseball League (East Division)
- Location: Chatham, Massachusetts
- Ballpark: Veterans Field
- Nickname: Chatham A's
- League championships: 1967, 1982, 1992, 1996, 1998
- Former name: Chatham Athletics; Chatham Red Sox
- Colors: Blue, White, and Red
- President: Steve West
- General manager: Mike Geylin
- Manager: Dennis Cook
- Website: www.chathamanglers.com

The Chatham Anglers, more commonly referred to as the Chatham A's and formerly the Chatham Athletics, are a collegiate summer baseball team based in Chatham, Massachusetts. The team is a member of the Cape Cod Baseball League (CCBL) and plays in the league's East Division. Chatham plays its home games at historic Veterans Field, the team's home since 1923, in the town of Chatham on the Lower Cape. The A's have been operated by the non-profit Chatham Athletic Association since 1963.

Chatham has won five CCBL championships, most recently in 1998, when they defeated the Wareham Gatemen in the championship series. Since the club's inception, over 100 players have gone on to play in Major League Baseball.

== History ==
=== Pre-modern era ===
==== The early Cape League era (1923–1939) ====
In 1923 the Cape Cod Baseball League was formed and included four teams: Chatham, Falmouth, Osterville, and Hyannis. This early Cape League operated through the 1939 season and disbanded in 1940, due in large part to the difficulty of securing ongoing funding during the Great Depression. Chatham competed in the Cape League from the league's inaugural 1923 season through the 1926 season, then from 1927 to 1929 competed as a combined Chatham-Harwich team with home games split between Veterans Field and Harwich's Brooks Park.

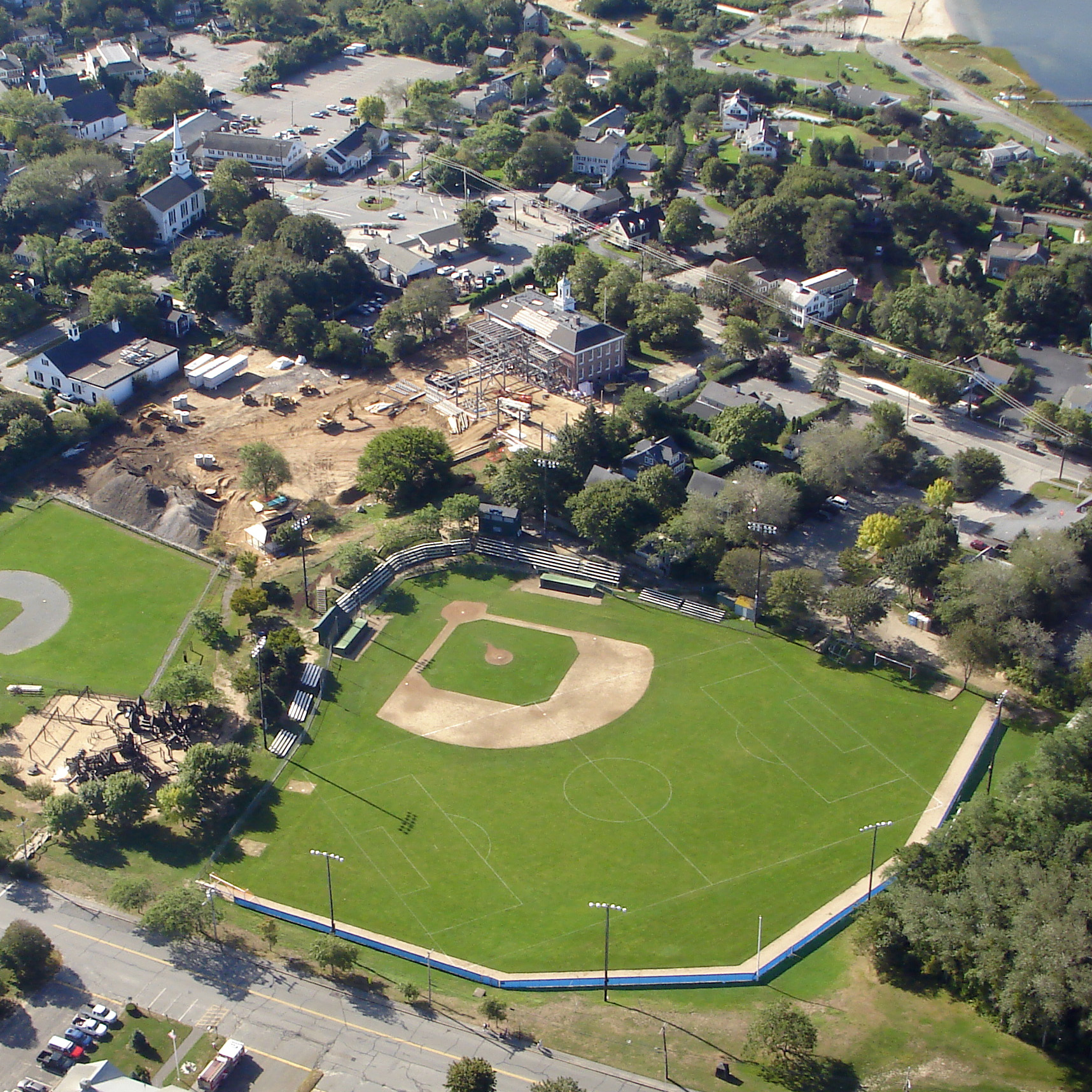
Veterans Field has been home of Chatham baseball since the 1920s.

Chatham's 1923 team included CCBL Hall of Famer Merrill Doane. Doane, a 1924 graduate of Chatham High School, remained involved in the Cape League and Chatham baseball for over 60 years. One of the longest-tenured general managers in Cape League history, Doane was instrumental in the league's transition to an NCAA-sanctioned collegiate league in the early 1960s, and helped build the powerful Chatham teams of the 1960s. In 1925, Brockton High School star Pat Creeden played third base for Chatham, and went on to play briefly for the Boston Red Sox in 1931.

In the 1927 season, the combined Chatham-Harwich team finished fourth in the five-team league, but nevertheless was described as "the hardest hitting team in the league." 1927 Chatham-Harwich first baseman Jack Burns went on to play in seven major league seasons for the St. Louis Browns and Detroit Tigers. In all three seasons of the joint Chatham-Harwich team, the club featured Boston College batterymates pitcher Pete Herman and catcher George Colbert, as well as flashy infielder Artie Gore. The trio of Herman, Colbert and Gore later teamed up again with Barnstable to bring that club multiple Cape League championships in the 1930s. Gore went on to a major league umpiring career, working ten years in the National League, including two World Series assignments.

In 1930, Chatham again fielded its own team, as Harwich split off and became a separate club. Pete Herman remained with the Chatham team as its player-manager in 1930 and 1931, leading the team on an exciting stretch run and second-place finish just two games behind pennant-winning Wareham in 1930.

Chatham withdrew from the league prior to the 1932 season as a result of the town's decision not to appropriate funds for the team. Throughout the rest of the 1930s, Chatham's town team competed in the Cape Cod Twilight League, winning that league's title seven consecutive seasons from 1933 to 1939.

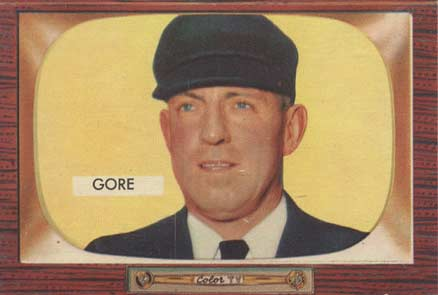
Artie Gore was a flashy infielder for Chatham-Harwich from 1927 to 1929, and went on to a ten-year umpiring career in the National League.

==== The Upper and Lower Cape League era (1946–1962) ====
After a hiatus during the years of World War II, the Cape League was reconstituted in 1946, with Chatham joining the Lower Cape Division. Chatham has been a member of the Cape League ever since.

In 1957, Chatham was led by CCBL Hall of Famer Bill Walker, who posted a league-leading .432 batting average. CCBL Hall of Fame skipper John Carroll took the helm at Chatham in 1961. The following season, Carroll's club finished the regular season in first place atop the Lower Cape Division, but failed to reach the Cape League title series, losing to Harwich in the Lower Cape championship series.

=== Modern era (1963–present) ===
==== The 1960s: A new league and a first championship ====
In 1963, the CCBL was reorganized and became officially sanctioned by the NCAA. The league would no longer be characterized by "town teams" who fielded mainly Cape Cod residents, but would now be a formal collegiate league. Teams began to recruit college players and coaches from an increasingly wide geographic radius.

The league was originally composed of ten teams, which were divided into Upper Cape and Lower Cape divisions. Chatham's team, known as the Chatham Red Sox, joined Orleans, Harwich, Yarmouth and a team from Otis Air Force Base in the Lower Cape Division.

Chatham continued to be managed by John Carroll, whose 1963 club featured CCBL Hall of Famer Ken Voges of Texas Lutheran University, who led the league with an astronomical .505 batting average. The Red Sox finished the regular season with a 28–6 record, good enough for first place in the Lower Cape Division, but fell to Orleans in the playoffs.

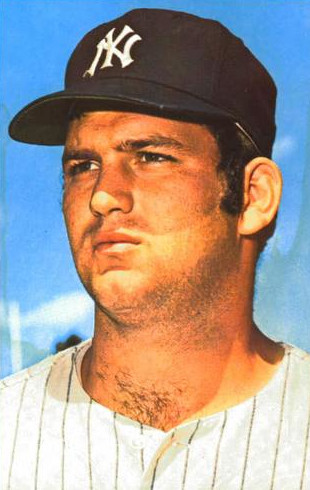
Thurman Munson led Chatham to its first CCBL championship in 1967.

Chatham continued its regular season dominance in 1964, 1965 and 1966, finishing atop the Lower Cape Division each year, but falling in each season's CCBL title series. The 1964 team was piloted by Bill "Lefty" Lefebvre, who had played in the Cape League for Falmouth in the 1930s, and had later played in the major leagues with Boston and Washington. Lefebvre's team featured CCBL Hall of Fame second baseman Steve Saradnik of Providence College, who batted .314, and pitcher Charlie Hough, who went on to a 25-year major league knuckleballing career.

In 1965, Lefebvre was succeeded by CCBL Hall of Fame manager Joe "Skip" Lewis, who led the team through 1969. Lewis' 1965 squad returned Saradnik, and added another two CCBL Hall of Famers in University of Connecticut righty Ed Baird, who posted a 3–0 record with a 0.45 ERA, and George Greer, who batted .349 and led the league in doubles and triples.

The star-studded 1966 Chatham team returned Saradnik, Baird and Greer, and added another three CCBL Hall of Famers: catcher Tom Weir, who led the league with a .420 batting average, all-star hurler Joe Jabar, who went 7–0 with a 1.53 ERA and took home the league's Outstanding Pitcher Award, and Pittsfield, Massachusetts native Tom Grieve. Drafted out of high school in the first round, sixth overall, of the 1966 Major League Baseball draft by the Washington Senators, Grieve played in 25 games for Chatham and batted .416 prior to signing with Washington and moving on to a lengthy major league career.

In 1967, it finally came together for Lewis' boys. Saradnik, Greer, Baird and Jabar all returned and were hungry for a title. Added to the mix was Kent State University catcher Thurman Munson, who hit .420 on the season and was named league MVP. During the regular season, Chatham pitcher Don Gabriel tossed a no-hitter against Harwich at Veterans Field. Chatham again finished in first place in the Lower Cape Division, and met Upper Cape powerhouse Falmouth for the second consecutive season in the title series. In Game 1 of the championship, Chatham pitcher John Frobose twirled 13 innings in a game that was called due to darkness and ended in a 1–1 tie. Chatham took Game 2, 7–1, behind the stellar pitching of Baird. Jabar, the league's Outstanding Pitcher, was the star of Game 3, tossing a complete game five-hitter, and knocking in the game-winning RBI in Chatham's 3–2 victory, clinching the series and giving Chatham its first Cape League championship.

Munson went on to be selected by the New York Yankees in the first round, fourth overall, of the 1968 Major League Baseball draft. A perennial all-star for the Bronx Bombers, Munson won two World Series and was named the Yanks' first captain since Lou Gehrig. His tragic 1979 death brought fond reminiscences from those who knew him at Chatham. Munson was inducted into the CCBL Hall of Fame as part of its inaugural class of 2000, and his name graces the league's annual award for batting champion.

==== The 1970s ====
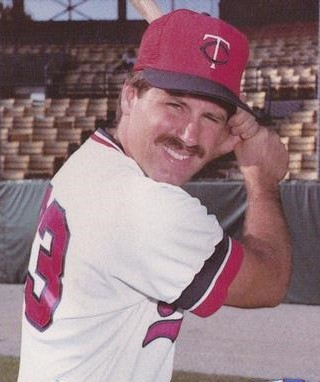
CCBL Hall of Famer Mike Stenhouse played for Chatham in 1977, '78 & '79.

In the late 1960s, Chatham had dropped the nickname "Red Sox", and reverted to the colloquial Chatham Townies moniker of earlier years. In 1972, the Chatham Athletic Association settled on Chatham Athletics as the team's new moniker, and the Chatham A's were born. The A's finished the 1973 regular season in first place atop the Cape League under skipper Ben Hays. The team featured future major leaguer Dave Bergman, the CCBL batting champ who hit at a .341 clip, and CCBL Hall of Fame hurler John Caneira, the league's Outstanding Pitcher, who posted a 9–1 record and led the league with a 1.37 ERA while striking out 118 and walking only 23 in 92 innings.

CCBL Hall of Fame manager Ed Lyons took the reins in 1976, and led the A's to another first-place finish. Chatham was led by the league's Outstanding Pro Prospect Steve Taylor, and CCBL Hall of Famer Mickey O'Connor, a 6-foot-6 southpaw who went 9–0 with a 1.07 ERA and eight complete games, and was the league's Outstanding Pitcher. The team ousted Hyannis in the playoffs, but was shut down by Wareham in the title series. Lyons skippered the Athletics for seven seasons, with the team qualifying for postseason play in six of the seven years.

The A's of the late 1970s featured Jim Lauer, who set a CCBL record with three home runs in a single game against Hyannis, Harvard University slugger and CCBL Hall of Famer Mike Stenhouse, who starred for Chatham from 1977 through 1979, and longtime major league hurler and CCBL Hall of Famer Walt Terrell, who went 9–4 with a 2.20 ERA in 1979 while working a league record 122.2 innings on the season.

==== The 1980s and a second championship ====
Lyons again skippered Chatham to a first-place finish in 1980 before succumbing to Falmouth in the championship series. The 1980 A's starred CCBL Hall of Famers Glenn Davis, who batted .377 on the season, and Jim Sherman, who batted .339 and returned to Chatham in 1981 and enjoy another all-star season, batting .335.

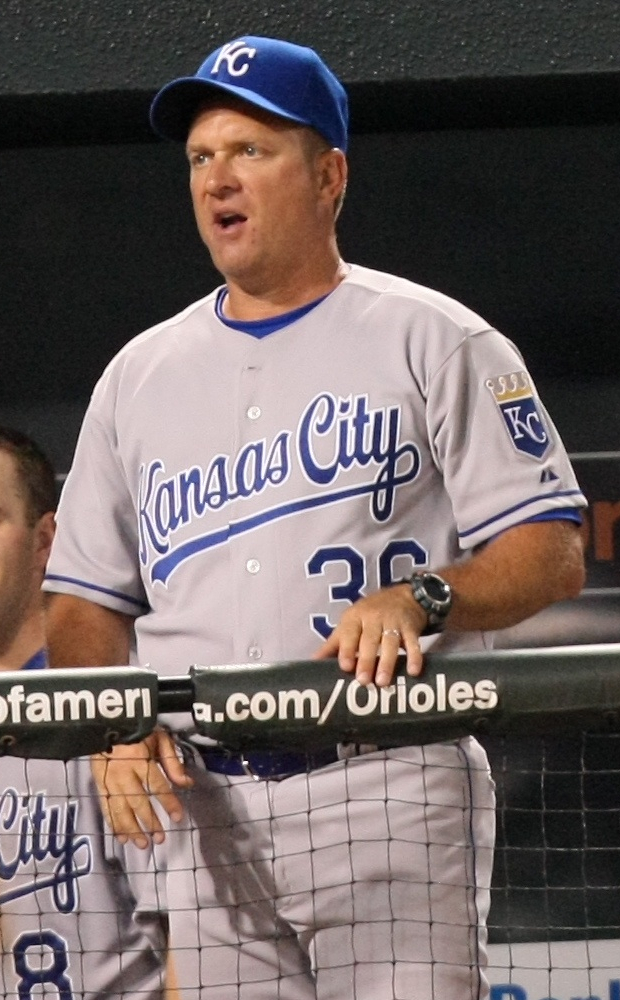
Kevin Seitzer hit .677 in the playoffs for Chatham's 1982 CCBL title team.

In 1982, skipper Ed Lyons announced mid-season that he would be retiring after the summer. Lyons had managed six seasons at Wareham in the early 1970s, and was now in his seventh season with Chatham, but had yet to win a league title. Lyons' 1982 A's finished the regular season in fourth place with a pedestrian 20–21–1 record, having slipped into the playoffs on the final day of the season with a victory over Orleans. The team starred future major league all-star Kevin Seitzer, who hit .291 on the season and .677 in the playoffs, slugger Billy Merrifield, who clouted eight homers on the season, team MVP Brett Elbin, all-star centerfielder Greg Schuler, and the league's Outstanding Pro Prospect, pitcher Gary Kanwisher, who led the league with a 1.57 ERA. Lyons' staff included young third base coach John Schiffner. The A's matched up against first place Wareham in the playoff semi-finals, and promptly disposed of the Gatemen in two games.

In the championship series, Chatham met up with Hyannis in a best three-out-of-five title tilt. The A's went on the road for Game 1, and came away with a tight 5–4 win in 11 innings. Game 2 at Veterans Field also went to extra frames, with the Mets taking a 4–3 lead in the 11th, but the home club tied it in the bottom half, and then took the lead in the 12th to win by another 5–4 tally. Reliever Kurt Lundgren got the win in both games, coming on in the eighth inning of Game 1, then in the 12th inning of Game 2 to nail it down after starter Kanwisher held the mound through eleven. After two nail-biters, Game 3 at McKeon Park was a runaway. The A's led off the game with a dinger by Elbin and another by Merrifield, scoring four runs in the first for starter Jeff Brewer, and never looked back. Brewer tossed a complete game four-hitter, and the A's pummeled the Mets, 9–0, to complete the three-game sweep and claim Chatham's second league crown.

In 1983, A's slugger Bob Larimer tied a league mark by crushing three home runs in a single game; his feat demonstrated power to all fields as his trio of clouts against Falmouth left the yard in left, center, and right fields respectively. Chatham boasted the league MVP in 1984, as CCBL Hall of Famer Joey Cora was the A's all-star second baseman, batting .373 and leading the league with 28 stolen bases. The 1985 A's returned to the league championship series behind the play of CCBL Hall of Famers Tim McIntosh and Mark Petkovsek, but were shut down by Cotuit. McIntosh led the league with a .392 batting average, and Petkovsek went 7–1 for the A's and returned to Chatham the following season to win another seven games.

The late 1980s saw a pair of future major league sluggers in the Chatham lineup. Albert "Joey" Belle played for the A's in 1986, and went on to crush 381 major league homers. Jeff Bagwell spent the summers of 1987 and 1988 in Chatham. He struggled in his first season, but followed up with an all-star 1988 campaign in which he hit .315 with a .449 on-base percentage, and went 4-for-4 with a home run in the CCBL All-Star Game. Bagwell was inducted into the National Baseball Hall of Fame in 2017, the fifth former Cape Leaguer to be so honored.

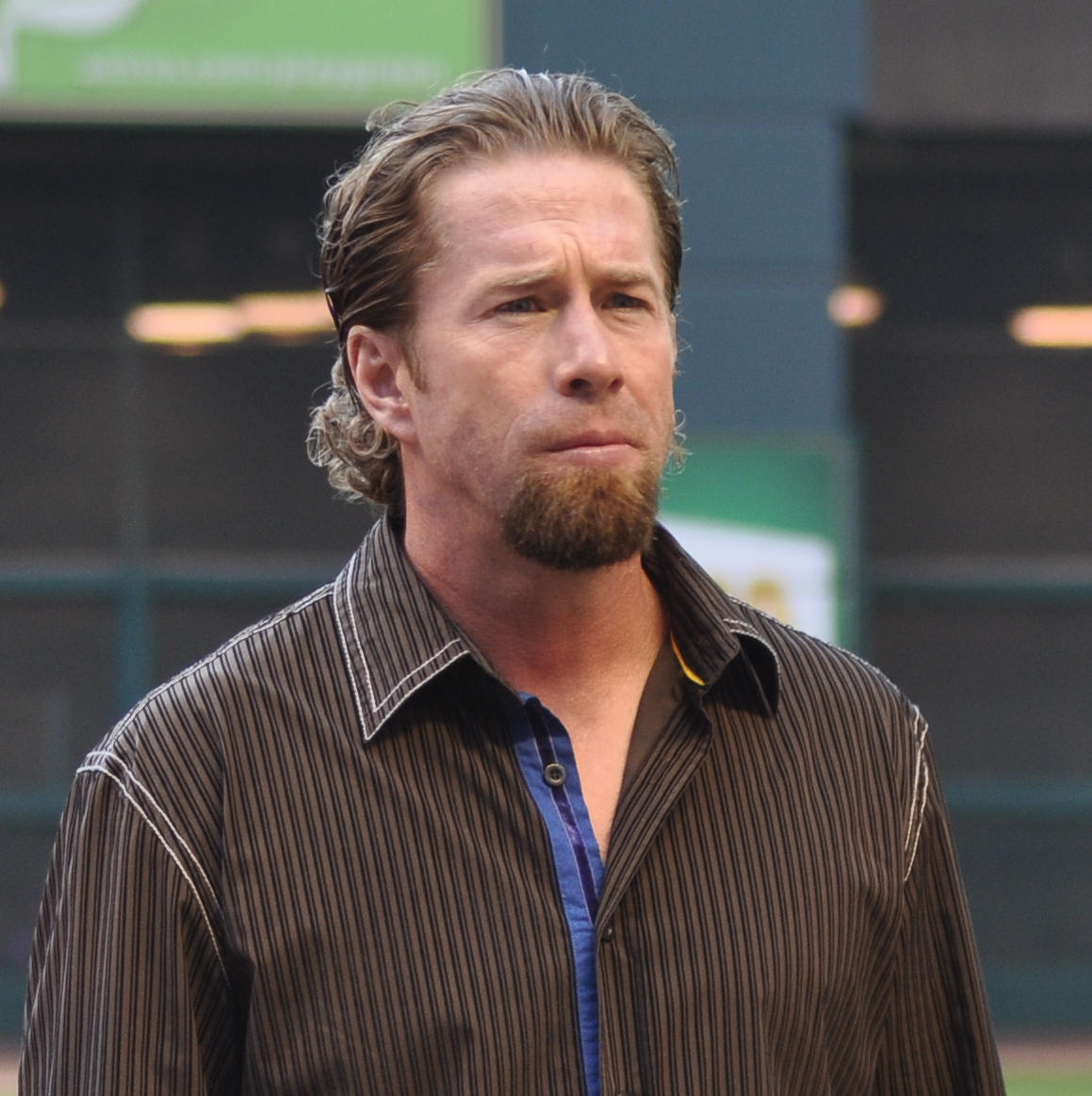
Baseball Hall of Famer Jeff Bagwell played for Chatham in 1987 and 1988.

==== The 1990s: a decade of dominance ====
Chatham was one of the league's most successful teams throughout the 1990s, finishing in first place atop the East Division five times, qualifying for the playoffs in eight of the ten years, reaching the league championship series six times, and taking home three CCBL crowns.

Skipper Rich Hill's 1992 Chatham squad posted an impressive 31–11 regular season record, and featured ace reliever Scott Smith and CCBL Hall of Fame hurler Steve Duda. Duda had pitched for the A's in 1991, posting a 4–4 record and tossing a no-hitter against Y-D. He was even better in 1992, going 6–1 with a 0.90 ERA. Duda led the A's into the 1992 playoffs against Brewster by tossing a complete game in Chatham's 4–2 Game 1 victory. The A's completed the sweep of the Whitecaps with a 1–0 victory in Game 2 to secure Chatham's spot in the league title series against Cotuit.

The A's took Game 1 of the 1992 championship series at Veterans Field, powered by a two-run blast by Mike Smedes. Game 2 at Lowell Park was an all-time classic. The game went into the 12th inning tied at 2–2 thanks to 11 stellar innings by A's starter Duda, who threw 125 pitches on three days' rest, and appeared to get stronger as the game moved along. Chatham played small-ball in the top of the 12th, pushing across Jeremy Carr, who had walked and reached third on a stolen base and a Cotuit error, then scored on a Brian Garrett single. Smith came on in relief of Duda in the bottom of the frame, and set down the Kettleers in order to clinch the series for the A's and secure Chatham's third CCBL title, with Duda taking home playoff MVP honors.

Midway through the 1993 season, manager Rich Hill left to take a head coaching job at the University of San Francisco, and assistant coach John Schiffner took the helm at Chatham. Schiffner, who had been Hill's assistant since 1990, had played in the CCBL for Harwich from 1974 through 1976, and had served previously as Chatham assistant coach from 1978 to 1982. He went on to pilot Chatham for a league record 25 years, and was inducted into the CCBL Hall of Fame in 2018. Schiffner's 1994 squad featured CCBL Hall of Famer Mike Lowell, an all-star second baseman who hit .307 for the A's. Lowell went on win World Series MVP honors with the 2007 Boston Red Sox. In 1995, Schiffner took the club to the CCBL title series, but lost to Cotuit.

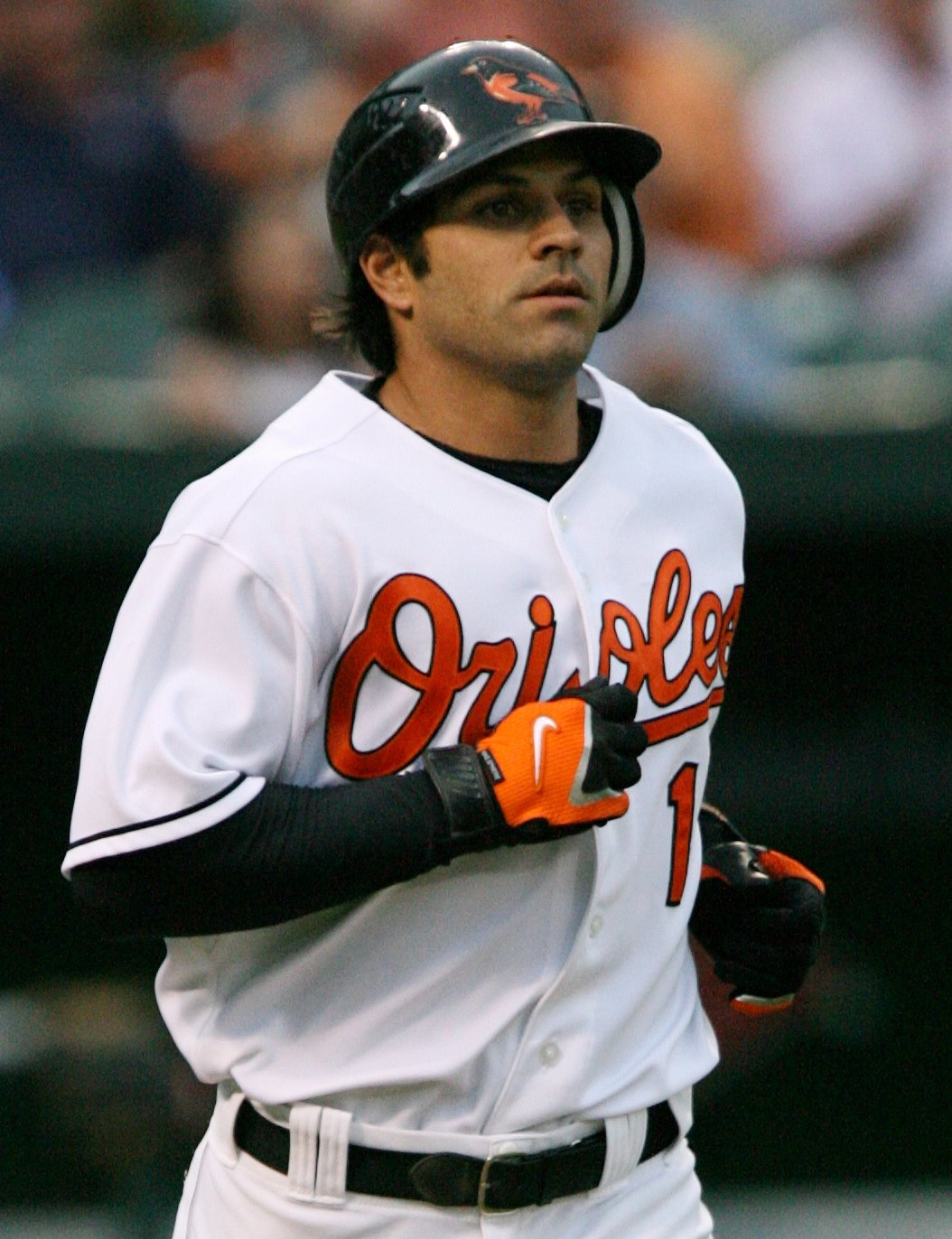
Brian Roberts played shortstop for Chatham's 1998 CCBL title club.

In 1996, Chatham featured the league's Outstanding Pro Prospect, fireballing reliever Matt Anderson, but the team struggled early on, losing eight in a row at one point. The A's finished the regular season a hair over the .500 mark, and met first place Brewster in the East Division playoffs. In Game 1, Chatham's Matt Purkiss clobbered a two-run homer in the third and ace Keith Evans worked 11 innings allowing only four hits as the A's and Whitecaps took a 2–2 tie into the 12th. In the top of the 12th, Chatham's Scott Friedholm smashed a three-run homer to left, and Anderson came on in the bottom half of the frame to nail down the victory. Chatham completed the sweep with a 3–0 win in Game 2 on the strength of second baseman Jermaine Clark's two-run double, and advanced to the title series against Falmouth.

The 1996 championship series opened at Guv Fuller Field, with Chatham catcher Scott Fitzgerald stifling the Falmouth attack early on in Game 1, cutting down three stolen base attempts in the first three innings. Chatham pushed across three runs playing small-ball and A's starter and CCBL Hall of Famer Seth Etherton was masterful, twirling eight shutout innings and striking out 14 before turning it over to Anderson for the ninth-inning save in the A's 3–0 win. Evans took the mound for the A's in Game 2 at home and followed up his 11-inning semi-finals outing with a complete game gem. Clark, whom Schiffner described as the team's spark plug all season, went 3-for-4 with a pair of doubles to go with his usual stellar work in the field, and the A's downed the Commodores, 6–2, for the title. Evans and Clark shared playoff MVP honors as Chatham sealed its fourth Cape League championship and its first to be clinched at Veterans Field.

Schiffner's 1998 club was loaded with talent. Slugger Matt Cepicky was a .327 hitter who won the All-Star Game Home Run Derby, and took home East Division MVP honors in the East's 3–2 All-Star Game victory at Veterans Field. In addition to Cepicky, the A's boasted an abundance of top moundsmen. 6-foot-8 righty Kyle Snyder was the league's Outstanding Pro Prospect, Tim Lavigne was the Outstanding Relief Pitcher, and CCBL Hall of Famer Rik Currier had an all-star season, posting a 5–2 record with a 2.37 ERA. After sweeping Brewster in the playoff semi-finals, the A's met Wareham in the best-of-five championship series.

Snyder started Game 1 of the 1998 title set for Chatham at Clem Spillane Field, but got roughed up by the Gatemen, who took the opener, 6–4. The A's held serve in Game 2 at Chatham as Jeremy Wade tossed a complete game five-hitter in the home club's 5–1 victory. Game 3 at Wareham was a classic pitcher's duel as Currier was matched up against CCBL Hall of Famer and future major league all-star Ben Sheets for the Gatemen. The game remained scoreless until the bottom of the 14th when the Gatemen walked off with the game's only run. The A's evened the series again in Game 4 at home, taking the lead in the bottom of the eighth on RBIs by Ryan Earey and Barry Gauch, and hanging on to win, 4–3. Behind the solid mound-work of Devon Nicholson, Chatham clung to a 3–1 lead through seven in a tense Game 5 finale that saw Gatemen skipper Don Reed tossed in the seventh. The A's broke it open in the eighth on a Brian Peterson two-run double, and tacked on another to make it a 6–1 title-clinching win. Cepicky, who went 12-for-32 with six RBI in the playoffs, shared MVP honors with Earey, who was strong in two relief appearances on the hill while going 3-for-10 at the plate.

The 1999 A's enjoyed a 30-win season and finished first in the East Division, falling to Cotuit in the championship series. The team returned Currier who had another brilliant season, posting a 7–0 record with a 1.34 ERA, and being named the league's Outstanding Pitcher. Currier was joined on the staff by CCBL Hall of Famer Derrick DePriest, who did not allow an earned run in 22.2 innings of work, and was named the league's Outstanding Relief Pitcher.

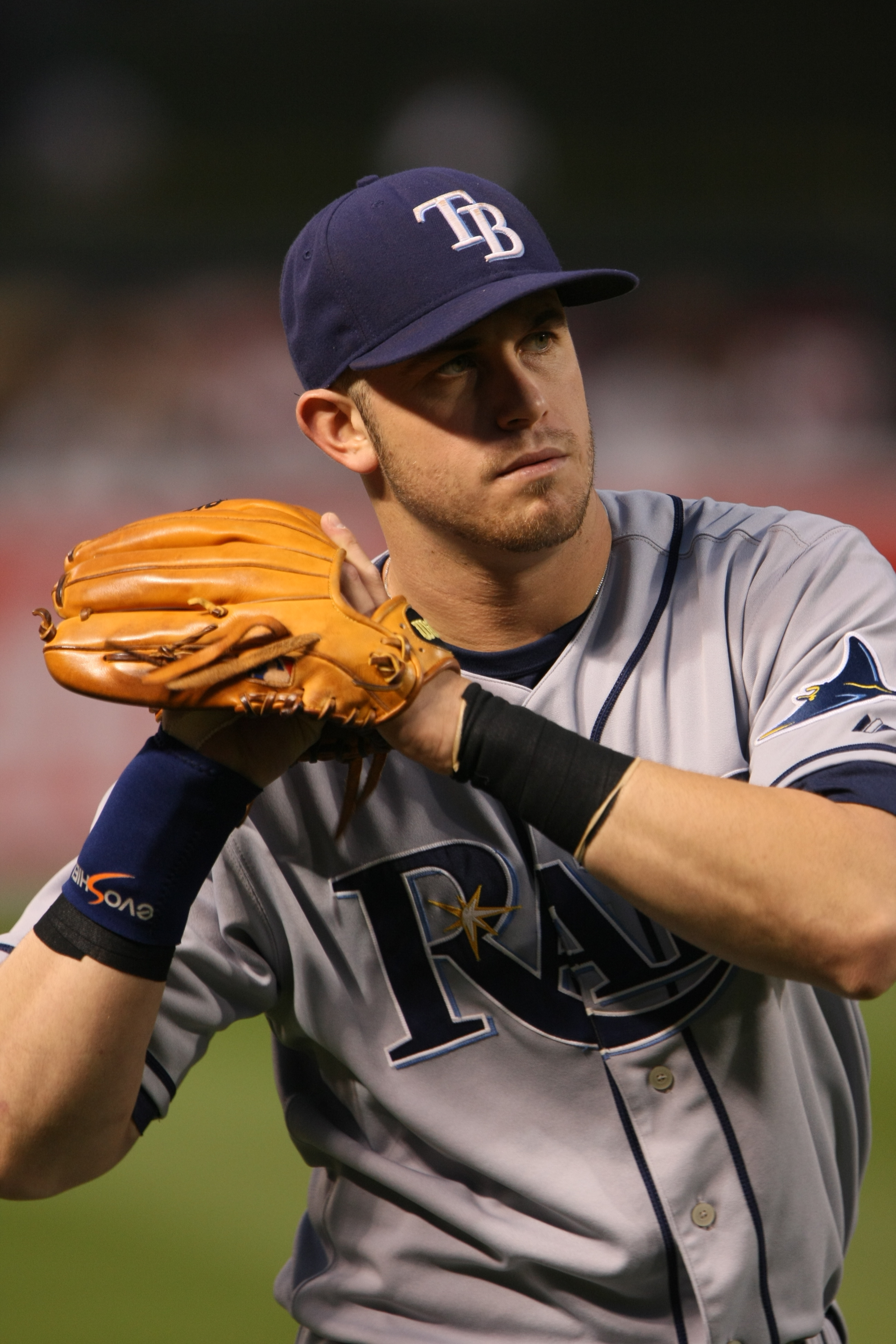
Evan Longoria was CCBL MVP for the A's in 2005.

==== The 2000s and the advent of the Anglers ====
The early 2000s saw a pair of CCBL Hall of Fame relievers take the mound for Chatham. Hard-throwing righty David Bush posted a 0.84 ERA and led the league with 11 saves in 2000, then returned in 2001 to record an even stingier 0.34 ERA. Fireballer Zane Carlson spent three sparkling seasons with the A's from 2001 through 2003. He earned 12 saves in each of his first two years, and 10 more in his third, with a combined three-year ERA of 2.23. Bush and Carlson led the 2001 squad to the CCBL championship series, but the team was defeated by Wareham.

Former A's manager Ed Lyons was honored by the team in 2001, as the 1982 title-winning skipper's uniform number "29" became the first number to be retired by the franchise. In 2006, the team paid the same honor to longtime assistant coach Matt Fincher, retiring his number "23".

Chatham's 2004 squad starred CCBL Hall of Famer Andrew Miller, whose season was highlighted by a remarkable four-inning outing in which he struck out the side in each inning, only to see the game and his performance wiped off the record books by unplayable conditions in the Chatham fog. Miller returned in 2005 to claim the CCBL's Outstanding Pitcher and Outstanding Pro Prospect awards, and was joined by a talented club including CCBL batting champion Chris Coghlan, and future major league all-stars Todd Frazier and CCBL MVP Evan Longoria. The 2008 Chatham club featured CCBL Hall of Famer Grant Green, the league's all-star game MVP and Outstanding Pro Prospect.

In late 2008, Major League Baseball announced that it would enforce its trademarks, and required those CCBL teams who shared a nickname with an MLB team to either change their nicknames or buy their uniforms and merchandise only through MLB-licensed vendors. Chatham opted to drop its "Athletics" moniker, and became the Chatham Anglers, a name which celebrated the town's nautical heritage and allowed for continued use of the "A's" nickname. The team also retained its uniform colors and pinstripe pattern.

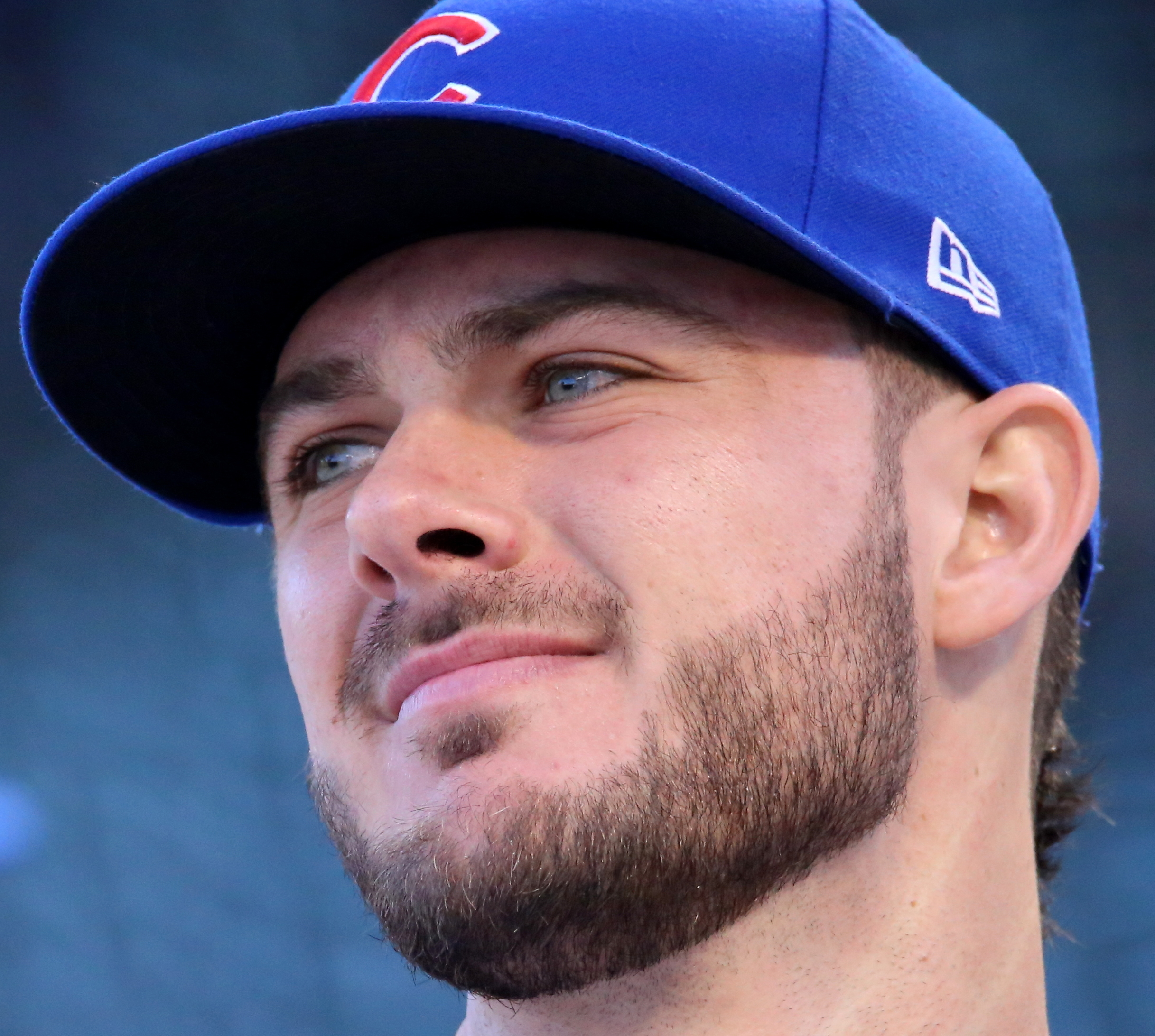
2011 Angler Kris Bryant

==== The 2010s and the end of the Schiffner era ====
The Anglers qualified for postseason play in seven of ten years in the 2010s, but remained in a championship drought for a second consecutive decade. The 2011 Anglers featured future major league all-star and National League MVP Kris Bryant and CCBL Home Run Derby champ Richie Shaffer. In 2013, the Anglers finished in first place atop the East Division, and starred the CCBL's Outstanding Pitcher, Lukas Schiraldi, and all-star infielder J. D. Davis, who took home All-Star Game MVP honors for the East Division for his double and three-run homer in the East's 9–4 victory.

Chatham boasted the CCBL's Outstanding New England Player in consecutive seasons in 2013 and 2014. West Haven, Connecticut's Tommy Lawrence of the University of Maine took home the honors in 2013 after a stellar season in the Chatham bullpen. Lawrence posted a 3–0 record with a 1.58 ERA, striking out 23 and walking just a single batter in 28 1/3 innings. The following summer, it was Lexington, Massachusetts native and Boston College slugger Chris Shaw. Shaw clubbed seven dingers to lead the league for Chatham in 2014, and finished second in the league with 31 RBIs.

Manager John Schiffner stepped down after the 2017 season, having held the post for a league record 25 summers. In 2018, first-year skipper Tom Holliday led the Anglers to the league championship series, where they were downed by Wareham. Holliday's club finished first in the East Division in 2019, but was bounced from the playoffs by Harwich.

==== The 2020s ====
The 2020 CCBL season was cancelled due to the coronavirus pandemic. Chatham missed the playoffs in each season from 2021 to 2023, marking the first time since the league moved to an eight-team playoff format that the Anglers failed to qualify for the postseason in three consecutive seasons. Chatham slugger Lyle Miller-Green claimed the league's annual All-Star Home Run Derby title in 2022.

The 2023 and 2024 seasons were marked by managerial instability, as Holliday resigned midway through the 2023 season, and was temporarily replaced by assistant coach Marty Lees, who then stepped down and was replaced for the remainder of the season by assistant coach Todd Shelton. Again in 2024, first-year skipper Jeremy Sheetinger resigned mid-season, and pitching coach Eric Beattie, a CCBL Hall of Fame pitcher with Bourne and former manager of Hyannis, finished the season as Chatham’s interim manager. Former major leaguer and Chatham pitching coach Dennis Cook took over managerial duties in 2025.

== CCBL Hall of Fame inductees ==
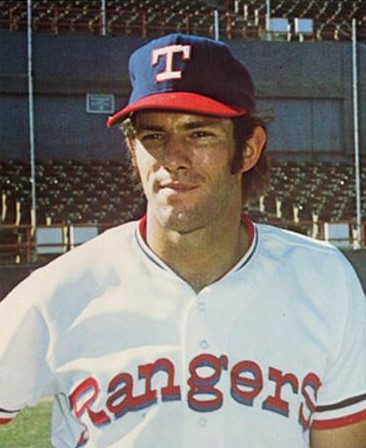
CCBL Hall of Famer Tom Grieve

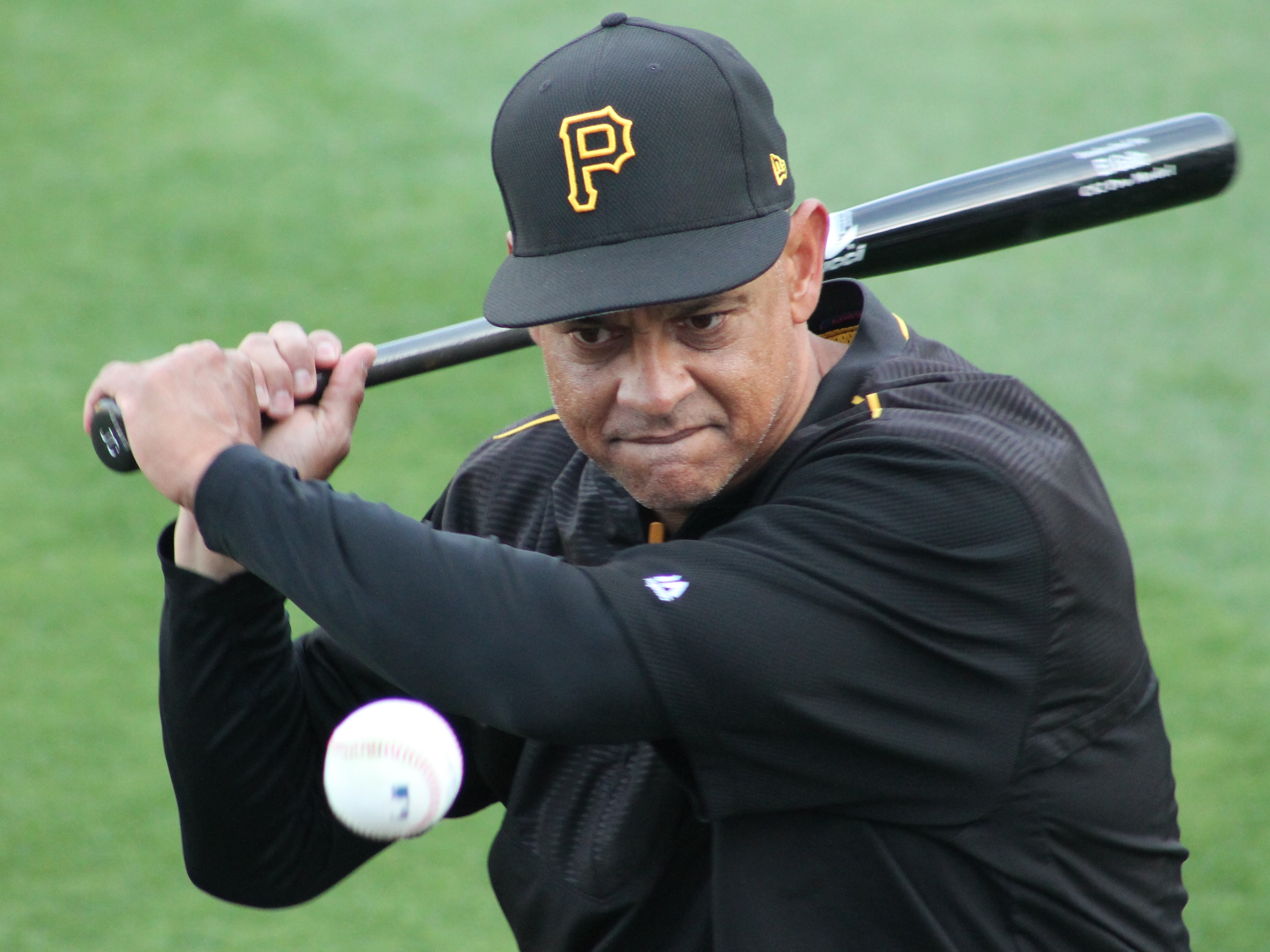
CCBL Hall of Famer Joey Cora

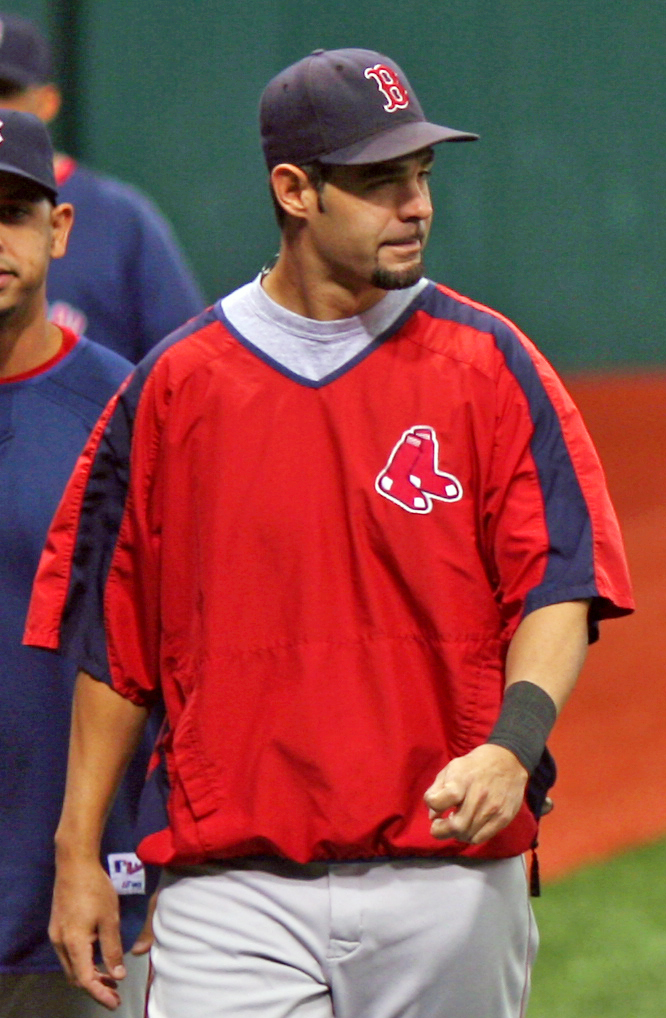
CCBL Hall of Famer Mike Lowell

The CCBL Hall of Fame and Museum is a history museum and hall of fame honoring past players, coaches, and others who have made outstanding contributions to the CCBL. Below are the inductees who spent all or part of their time in the Cape League with Chatham.

Year Inducted	Ref.	Name	Position
2000		Ed Lyons	Manager
2000		Thurman Munson	Player
2002		George Greer	Player
2003		Ed Baird	Player
2003		Joe Jabar	Player
2004		John Caneira	Player
2005		Ken Voges	Player
2006		Rik Currier	Player
2006		Steve Duda	Player
2007		Steve Saradnik	Player
2007		Walt Terrell	Player
2008		Derrick DePriest	Player
2008		Robert A. McNeece	Executive
2008		Mike Stenhouse	Player
2009		Zane Carlson	Player
2009		Joe “Skip” Lewis	Manager
2010		Tom Weir	Player
2010		Tom Grieve	Player
2011		David Bush	Player
2011		Mike Lowell	Player
2012		John Carroll	Manager
2012		Jim Sherman	Player
2012		Andrew Miller	Player
2013		Merrill Doane	Player / Executive
2013		Mickey O'Connor	Player
2016		Mark Petkovsek	Player
2017		Joey Cora	Player
2017		Tim McIntosh	Player
2018		John Schiffner	Manager
2018		Mark Sweeney	Player
2019		Paul Galop	Executive
2023		Glenn Davis	Player
2025		Bill Walker	Player
2026		Seth Etherton	Player
2026		Grant Green	Player

== Notable alumni ==
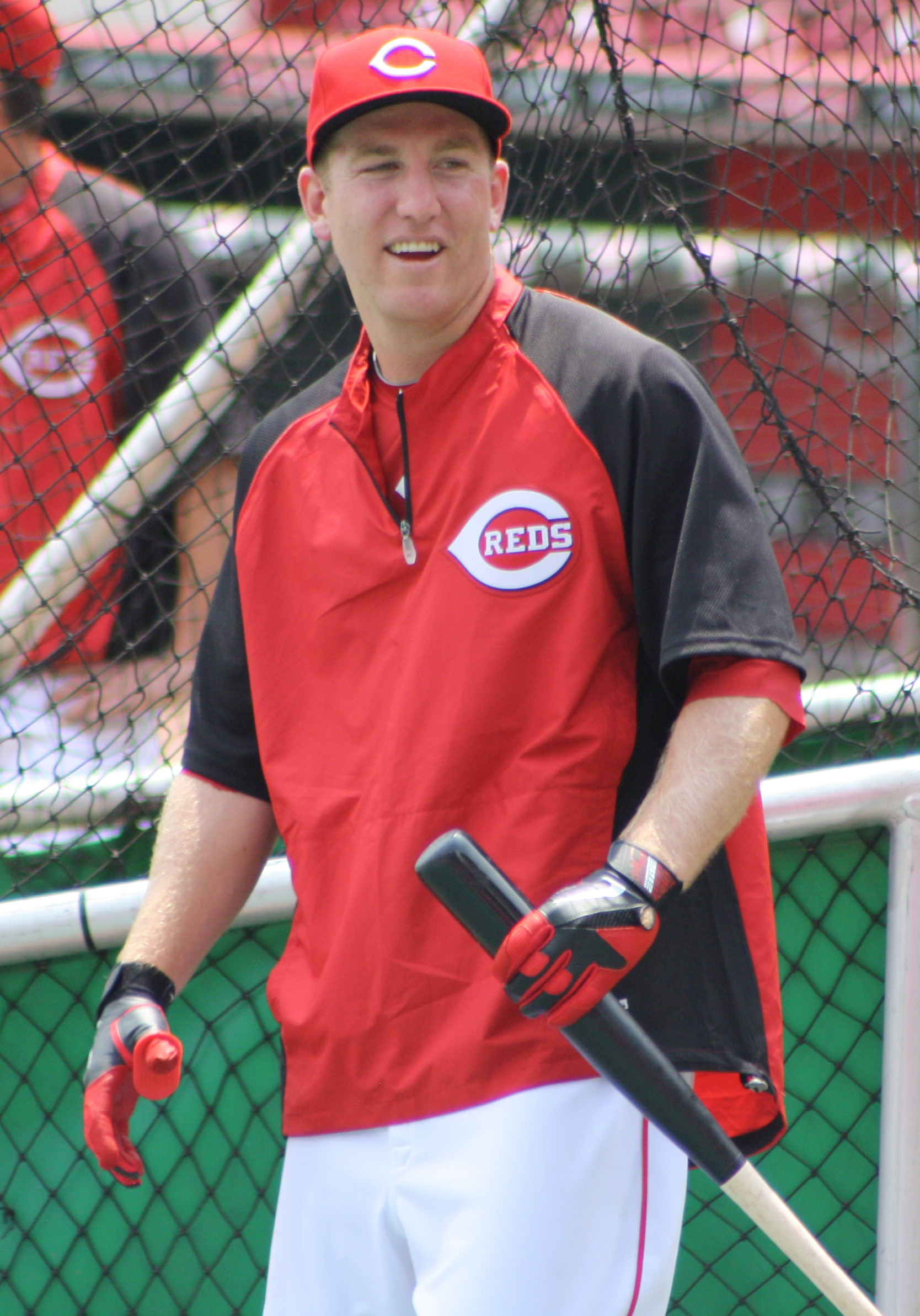
Todd Frazier

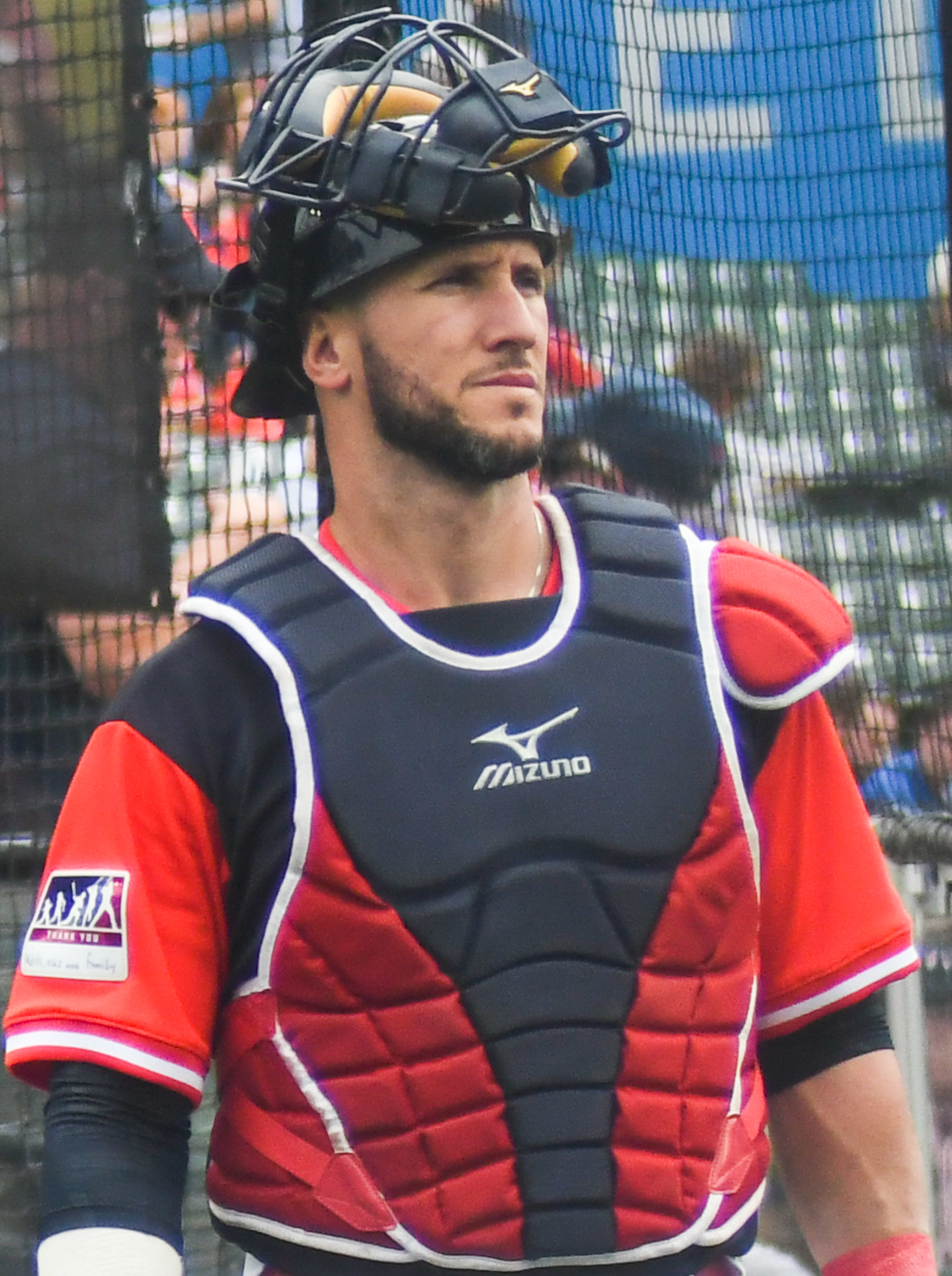
Yan Gomes

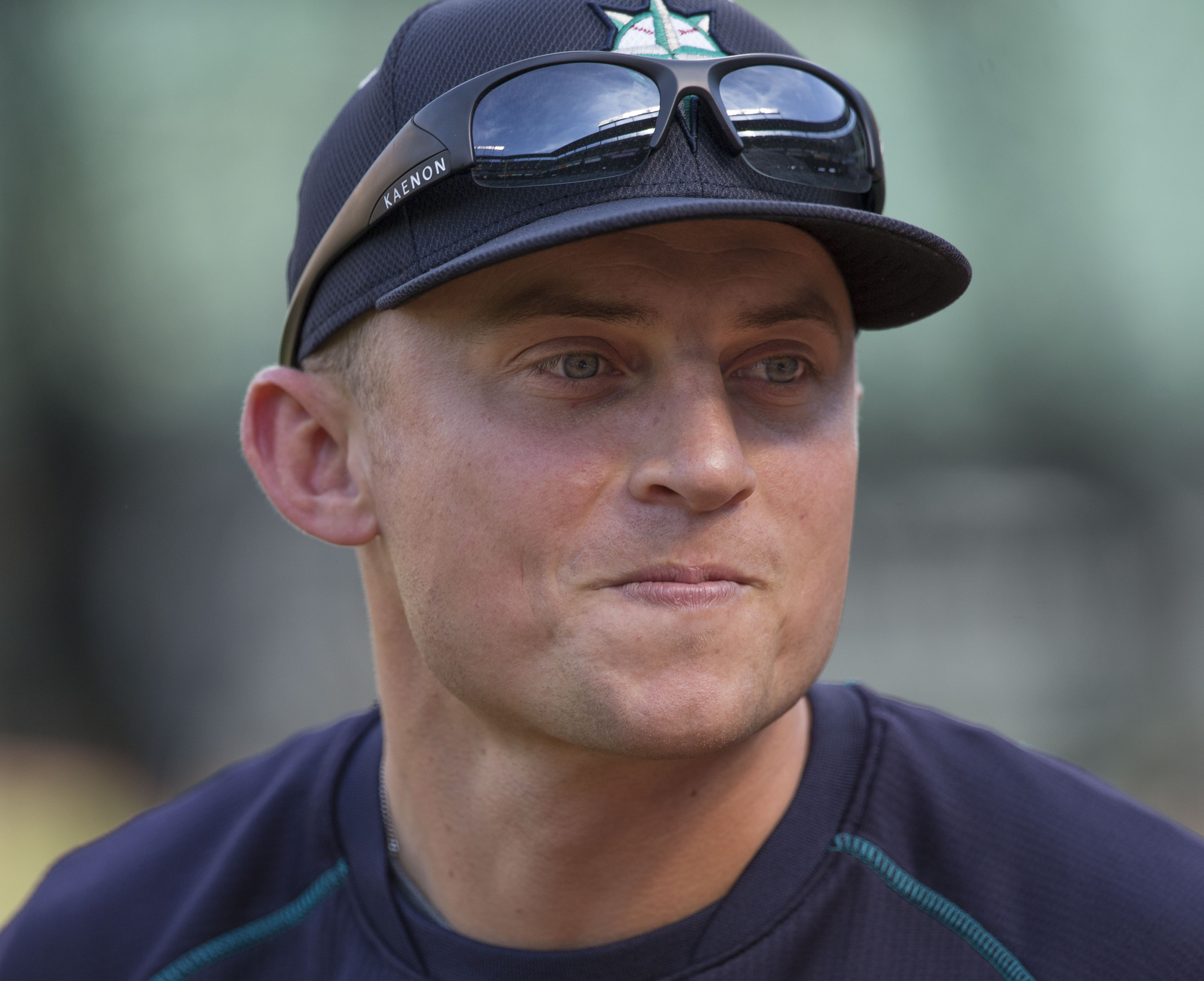
Kyle Seager

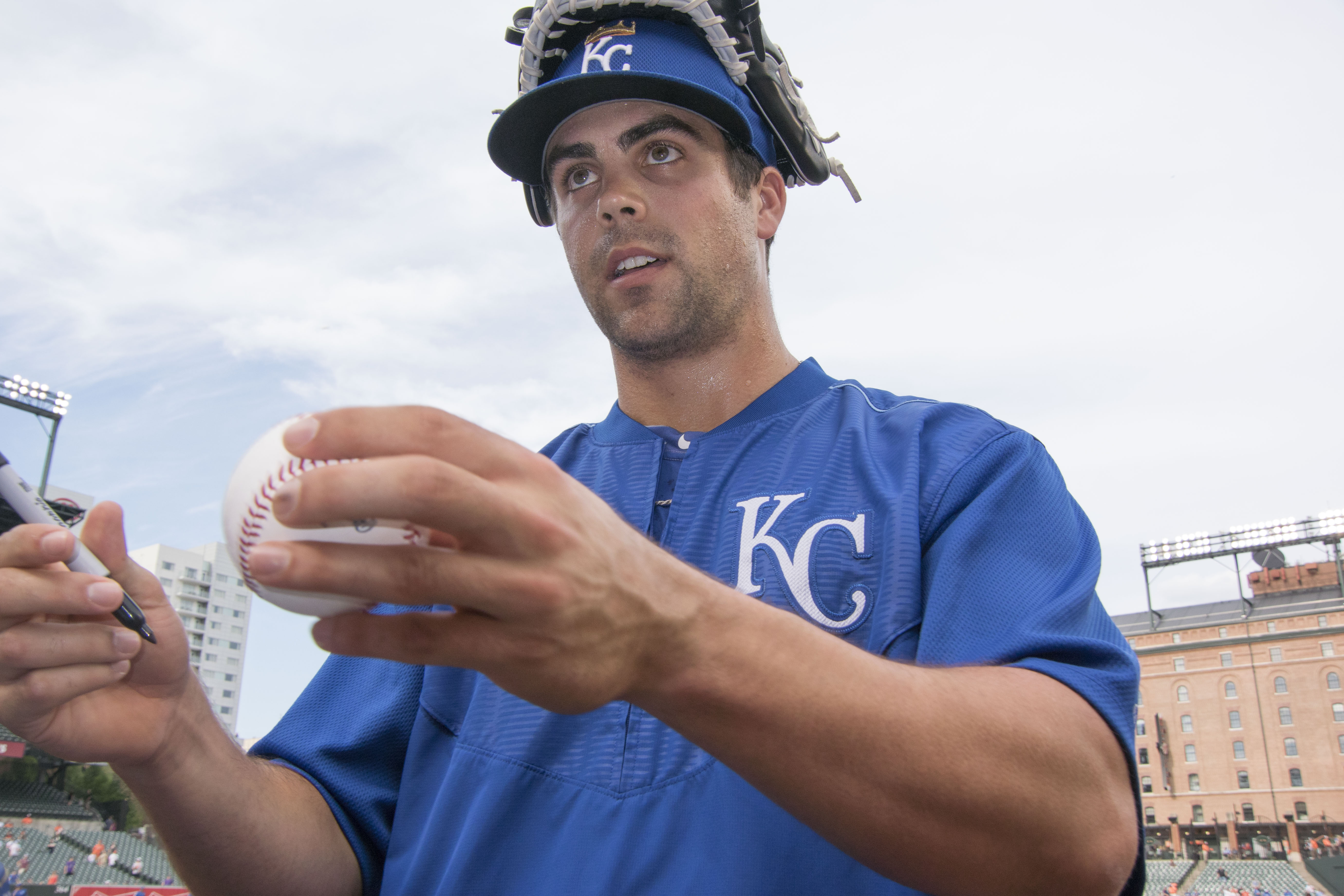
Whit Merrifield

- Jay Aldrich 1981
- Gabe Alvarez 1993–1994
- Matt Anderson 1996
- Sam Antonacci 2023
- Aiva Arquette 2024
- James Avery 2003–2004
- Jeff Bagwell 1987–1988
- Jason Bay 1999
- Albert Belle 1986
- Carson Benge 2023
- Dave Bergman 1973–1974
- Austin Bergner 2017–2018
- Harry Berrios 1992
- Ken Bolek 1975
- Sean Bouchard 2016
- Kip Bouknight 1999
- Brad Boxberger 2008
- Cody Bradford 2018
- Scott Bradley 1979–1980
- Ryan Braun 2000
- Brody Brecht 2023
- Charles Brewer 2007–2008
- Trenton Brooks 2015
- Brooks Brown 2005
- Corey Brown 2006
- Warren Brusstar 1971
- Kris Bryant 2011
- J. B. Bukauskas 2016
- Nick Burdi 2012
- Zack Burdi 2014
- Jack Burns 1927
- Michael Busch 2018
- David Bush 2000–2001
- Eric Byrnes 1995
- Shawn Camp 1996
- John Caneira 1973
- Luke Carlin 2001
- Chris Carpenter 2007
- Donovan Casey 2017
- Justin Cassel 2004
- Daniel Castano 2015
- Matt Cepicky 1998
- Andrew Chin 2014
- Jermaine Clark 1996
- Tony Cogan 1996
- Chris Coghlan 2005
- Mike Colangelo 1996
- P. J. Conlon 2014
- Andy Cook 1988
- Scott Coolbaugh 1985–1986
- Tim Cooney 2011
- Joey Cora 1984
- Tom Cosgrove 2016
- Will Craig 2015
- Pat Creeden 1925
- Brad Cresse 1997
- Jermaine Curtis 2007
- John Curtis 1967
- Davis Daniel 2018
- Jamie D'Antona 2002
- Jeff Datz 1981
- Glenn Davis 1980
- J. D. Davis 2013
- David DeJesus 1998–1999
- Nick Derba 2004–2006
- Tom Drees 1984
- Jim Duffy 1994
- Matt Duffy 2009
- Matt Dunbar 1988
- Parker Dunshee 2015
- Allan Dykstra 2006–2007
- Ed Easley 2006
- Adam Engel 2012
- Tristin English 2018
- John Ericks 1987
- Danny Espinosa 2006
- Seth Etherton 1995–1996
- Stuart Fairchild 2016
- Buck Farmer 2011
- Tim Federowicz 2007
- Huck Flener 1989
- Darrin Fletcher 1986
- Randy Flores 1995
- Ron Flores 1998
- Jason Foley 2016
- P. J. Forbes 1988
- Jake Fraley 2014–2015
- Jeff Frazier 2003
- Todd Frazier 2005–2006
- Marvin Freeman 1983
- Scott Friedholm 1996
- Tom Funk 1982
- Kyle Funkhouser 2013
- Hunter Gaddis 2018
- Matt Gage 2013
- Zac Gallen 2014–2015
- Rusty Gerhardt 1969
- Chris Getz 2003–2004
- Trey Gibson 2023
- Danny Godby 1965–1967
- Yan Gomes 2008
- Artie Gore 1929
- Jason Grabowski 1995–1996
- Josiah Gray 2017
- Gary Green 1982
- Grant Green 2008
- Adam Greenberg 2001
- George Greer 1965–1967
- Caden Grice 2021–2022
- Tom Grieve 1966
- Jeff Groth 1978
- Jesse Hahn 2009
- Dave Hajek 1988
- David Hale 2008
- Brad Halsey 2001
- Garrett Hampson 2014–2015
- Chase Hampton 2021
- Jason Hart 1997
- Matt Harvey 2008–2009
- Rod Henderson 1991
- Lincoln Henzman 2016
- Mark Higgins 1983
- Adam Hill 2017
- Rich Hill 2000–2001
- Taylor Hill 2009
- Chad Holbrook 1992
- Ricky Horton 1978
- Charlie Hough 1964
- Peter Hoy 1987
- David Huff 2004–2005
- Jared Hughes 2005
- Rick Huisman 1989
- Kyle Hurt 2018
- Chris Iannetta 2002
- Cooper Ingle 2022
- Joe Inglett 1997
- Ike Irish 2024
- Joseph Jabar 1966–1967
- Daniel Jackson 2024–2025
- Ray Jarvis 1964
- Connor Joe 2013
- Greg Jones 2018
- James Karinchak 2016
- Matt Kata 1997–1998
- Alex Katz 2014
- Mark Kiefer 1987
- Paul Kilgus 1982
- Scott Klingenbeck 1991
- Ryan Klosterman 2003
- Andrew Knapp 2012
- Reiss Knehr 2017
- Matt Koch 2011
- Kenny Koplove 2013
- Mike Koplove 1997
- Bobby Korecky 2001
- Tim Lahey 2003
- Chris Lambert 2003
- Shea Langeliers 2017
- Dominic Leone 2011
- Jeff Liefer 1995
- Pat Light 2011
- Todd Linden 2000
- Evan Longoria 2005
- Mike Lowell 1994
- Tyler Lyons 2009
- Mike MacDougal 1998
- Ty Madden 2019
- Alek Manoah 2018
- Harry Marino 2011
- Justin Marks 2008
- Trevor Martin 2021–2022
- Evan Marzilli 2011
- Isaac Mattson 2016
- Zach Maxwell 2021
- Patrick Mazeika 2014
- Marcus McBeth 2000
- Kyle McCann 2018
- Mike McCoy 2001
- Alex McFarlane 2021–2022
- Collin McHugh 2007
- Tim McIntosh 1986
- Nolan McLean 2021
- Tom McMillan 1972
- John McMillon 2018
- Víctor Mederos 2021
- Kevin Mench 1998
- Drew Mendoza 2018
- Whit Merrifield 2009
- Drew Meyer 2000–2001
- Chris Michalak 1991
- Andrew Miller 2004–2005
- Tommy Milone 2007
- Nate Mondou 2015
- Ray Montgomery 1989
- Trey Moore 1993
- Kevin Morgan 1989
- Mike Moriarty 1994
- Colt Morton 2002
- Thurman Munson 1967
- Greg Norton 1992
- Anthony Nunez 2022
- Dan O'Brien 1974
- Rouglas Odor 1987
- Ross Ohlendorf 2003
- Chad Orvella 2002
- Mike Pagliarulo 1980
- Andre Pallante 2017
- Kevin Parada 2021
- Bobby Parnell 2004
- Dan Peltier 1988
- Jeremy Peña 2017
- Mark Petkovsek 1985–1986
- Ed Phillips 1963
- Chad Pinder 2012
- Chris Pittaro 1981
- Alex Presley 2005
- A. J. Puckett 2015
- Zach Putnam 2007
- John Rave 2018
- Ace Reese 2025
- Kevin Reese 1999
- Roc Riggio 2022
- Tom Riginos 1988
- Matt Rizzotti 2006
- Brian Roberts 1998
- Dewey Robinson 1975
- Blake Sabol 2018
- John Schneider 2001
- Scott Schoeneweis 1993
- Nolan Schubart 2023
- Jaime Schultz 2012
- Tanner Scott 2014
- Andre Scrubb 2015
- Kyle Seager 2007–2008
- Kevin Seitzer 1982
- Richie Shaffer 2011
- Bryan Shaw 2007
- Chris Shaw 2014
- Jim Sherman 1980–1981
- Zack Short 2015
- Kyle Snyder 1998
- Chad Sobotka 2013
- Sammy Solís 2008
- Peter Soteropoulos 2001
- Brandon Sproat 2021
- Jacob Stallings 2009–2010
- Tim Stauffer 2002
- Steve Stemle 1996
- Mike Stenhouse 1977–1979
- Todd Steverson 1991
- Steve Stone 1968
- Josh Stowers 2017
- Marc Sullivan 1978
- Dave Swartzbaugh 1988
- Mark Sweeney 1988
- Steve Taylor 1976
- Joey Terdoslavich 2009
- Walt Terrell 1979
- Shawn Tolleson 2009
- Spencer Torkelson 2018–2019
- Jim Tracy 1976
- John Trautwein 1982
- Pat Valaika 2012
- Logan Verrett 2009–2010
- Ken Vining 1994–1996
- Derek Wallace 1991
- Joe Wallis 1971–1972
- Ben Wanger 2018
- Adam Warren 2008
- Mickey Weston 1981
- JJ Wetherholt 2023
- Carson Whisenhunt 2022
- Alex White 2007–2008
- Matt White 1997
- Garrett Whitlock 2016
- Howard J. Whitmore Jr. 1926
- Matt Wilkinson 2023
- Matt Williams 1991
- Scott Williamson 1996
- Cade Winquest 2021
- Kyson Witherspoon 2024
- Bobby Witt 1983
- Tanner Witt 2021
- Rob Wooten 2007
- Vance Worley 2006
- Chris Young 2000
- T. J. Zeuch 2015
- Brad Ziegler 2001

== Yearly results ==
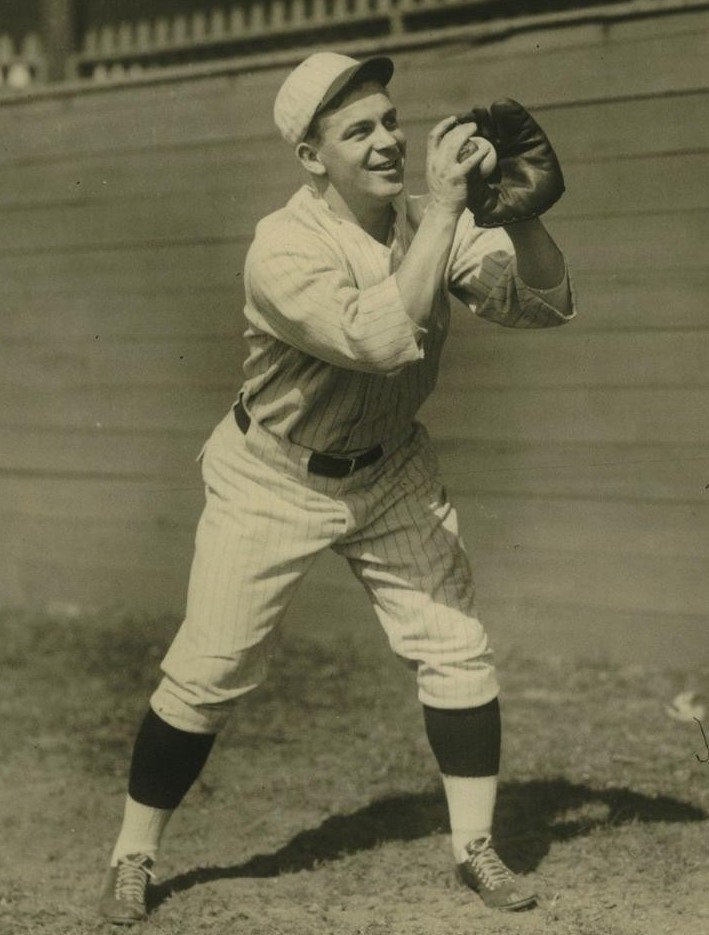
Pat Creeden played for Chatham in 1925, and later played for the Boston Red Sox.

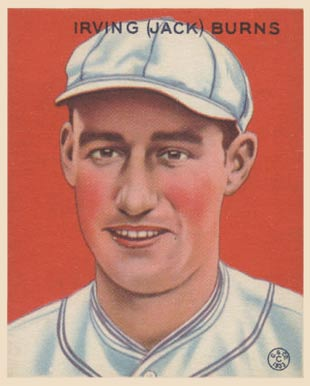
1927 Chatham first baseman Jack Burns later played for the St. Louis Browns and Detroit Tigers.

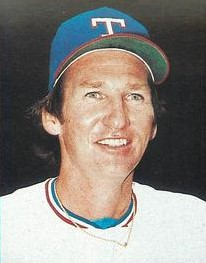
Charlie Hough pitched for Chatham in 1964, and went on to amass over 200 major league wins

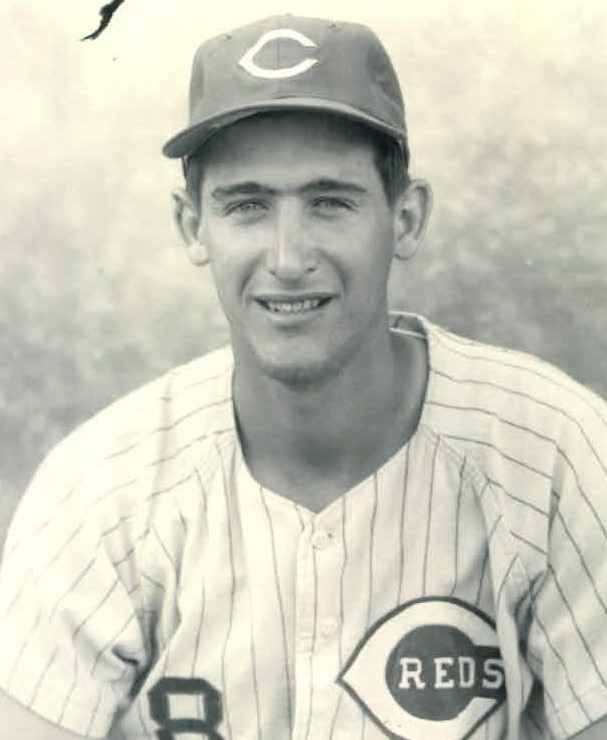
Danny Godby of Chatham's 1967 CCBL championship team

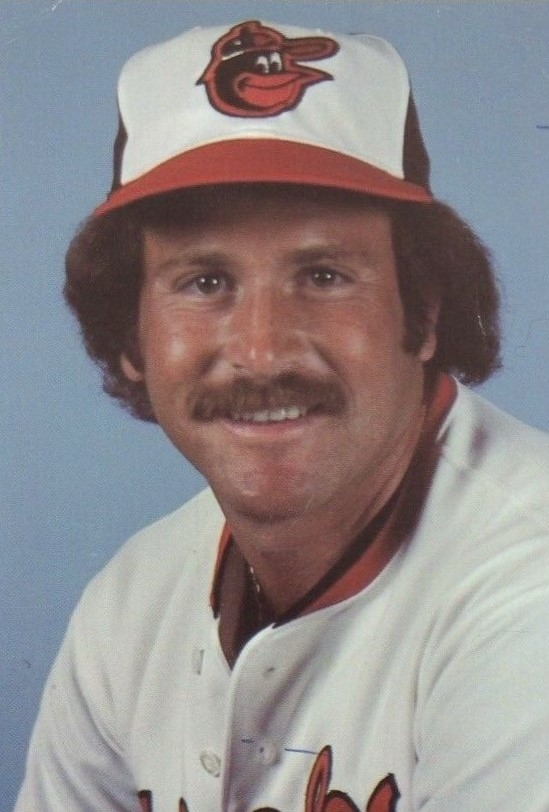
Steve Stone pitched for Chatham in 1968, and won the AL Cy Young Award in 1980.

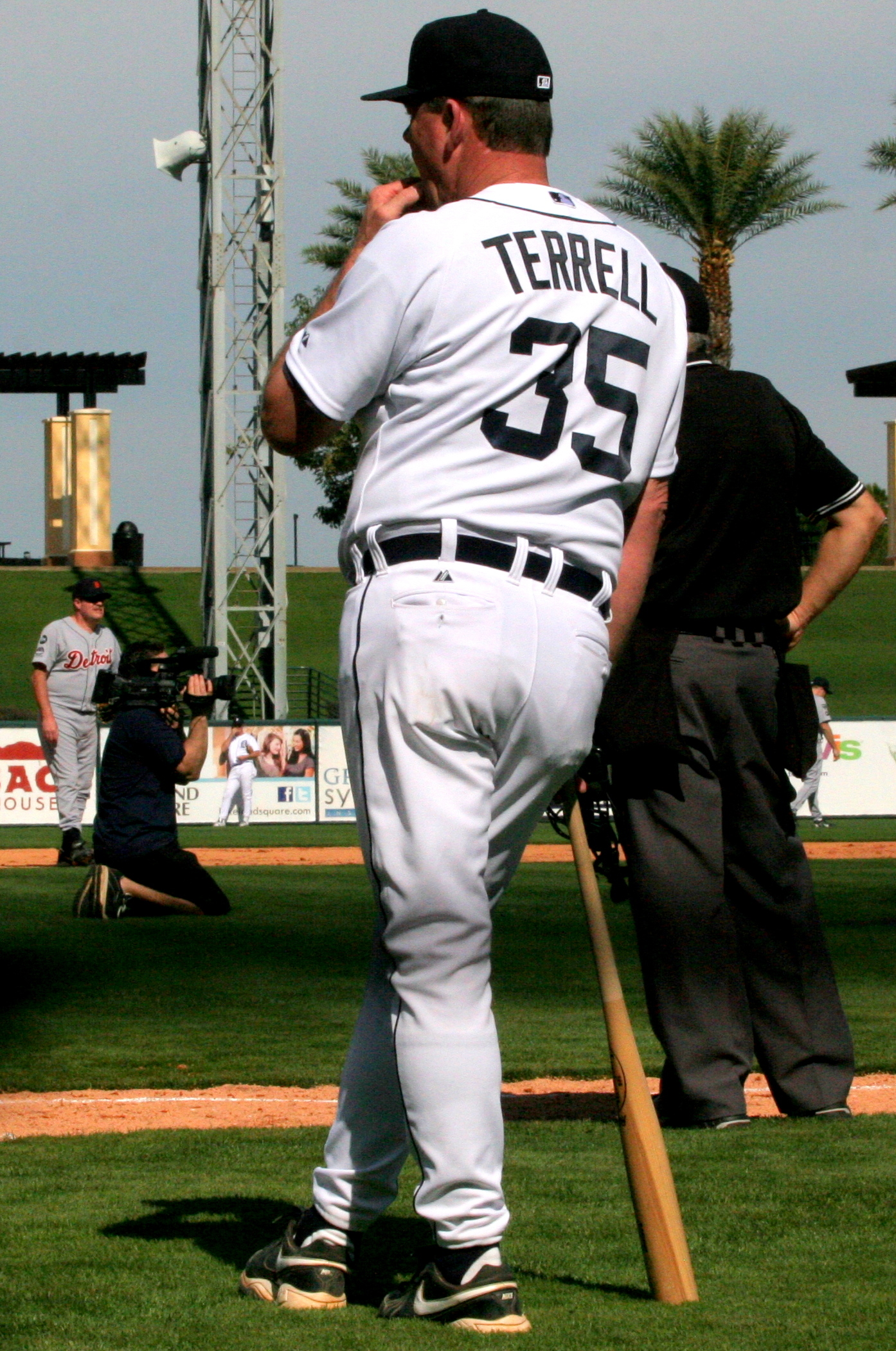
CCBL Hall of Famer Walt Terrell won the league's Outstanding Pitcher Award for Chatham in 1979

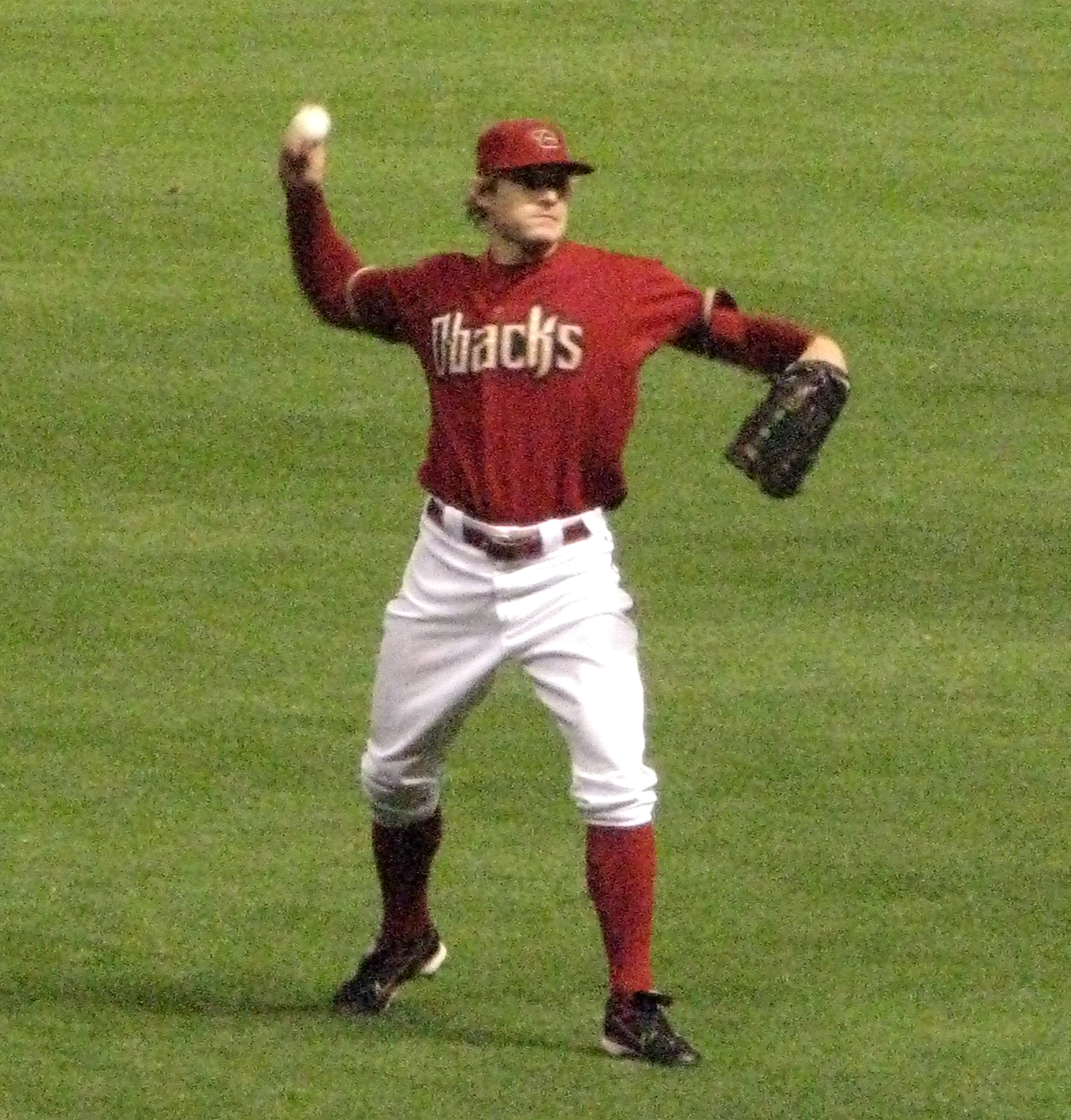
Eric Byrnes, Chatham 1995

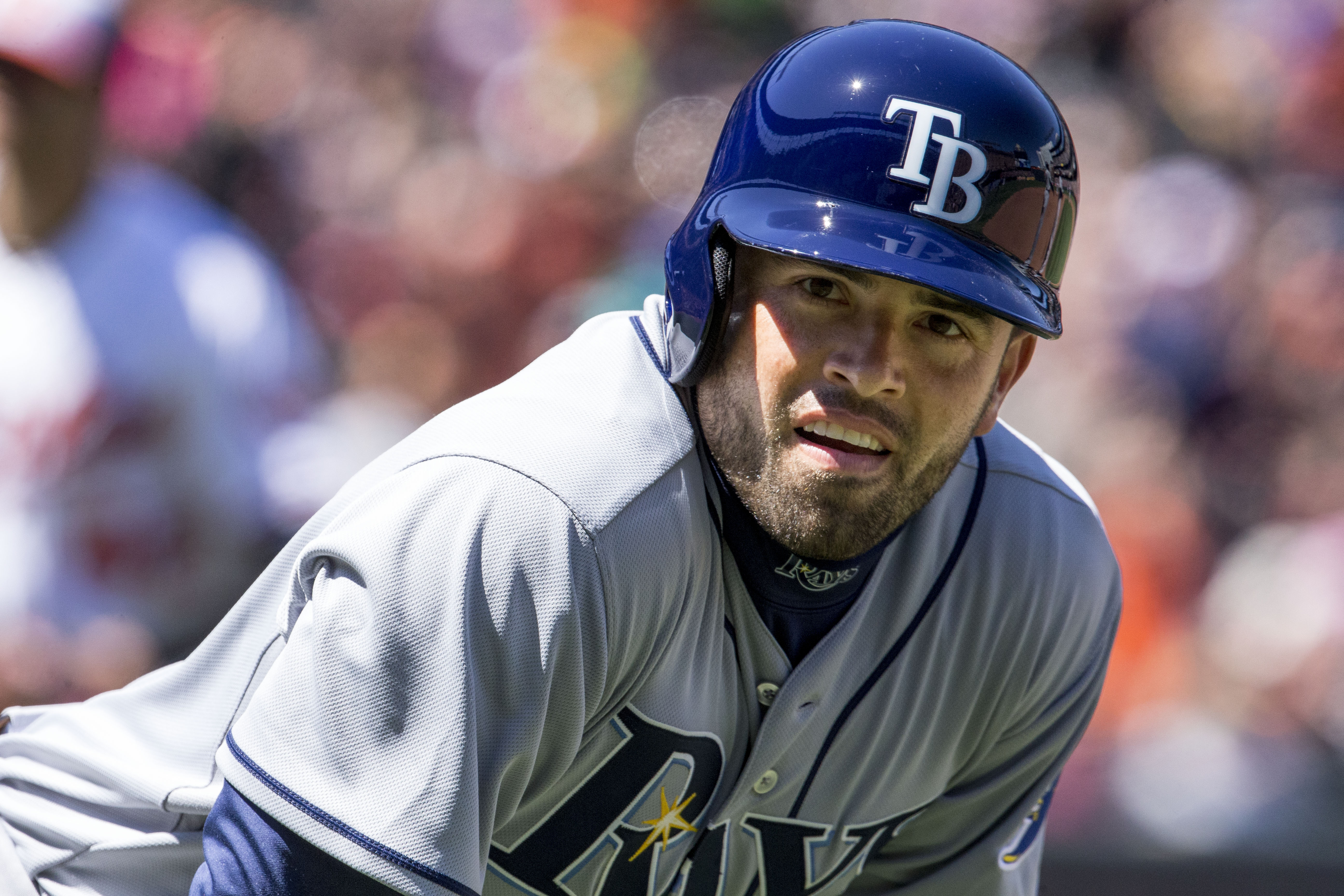
David DeJesus of Chatham's 1998 CCBL championship team

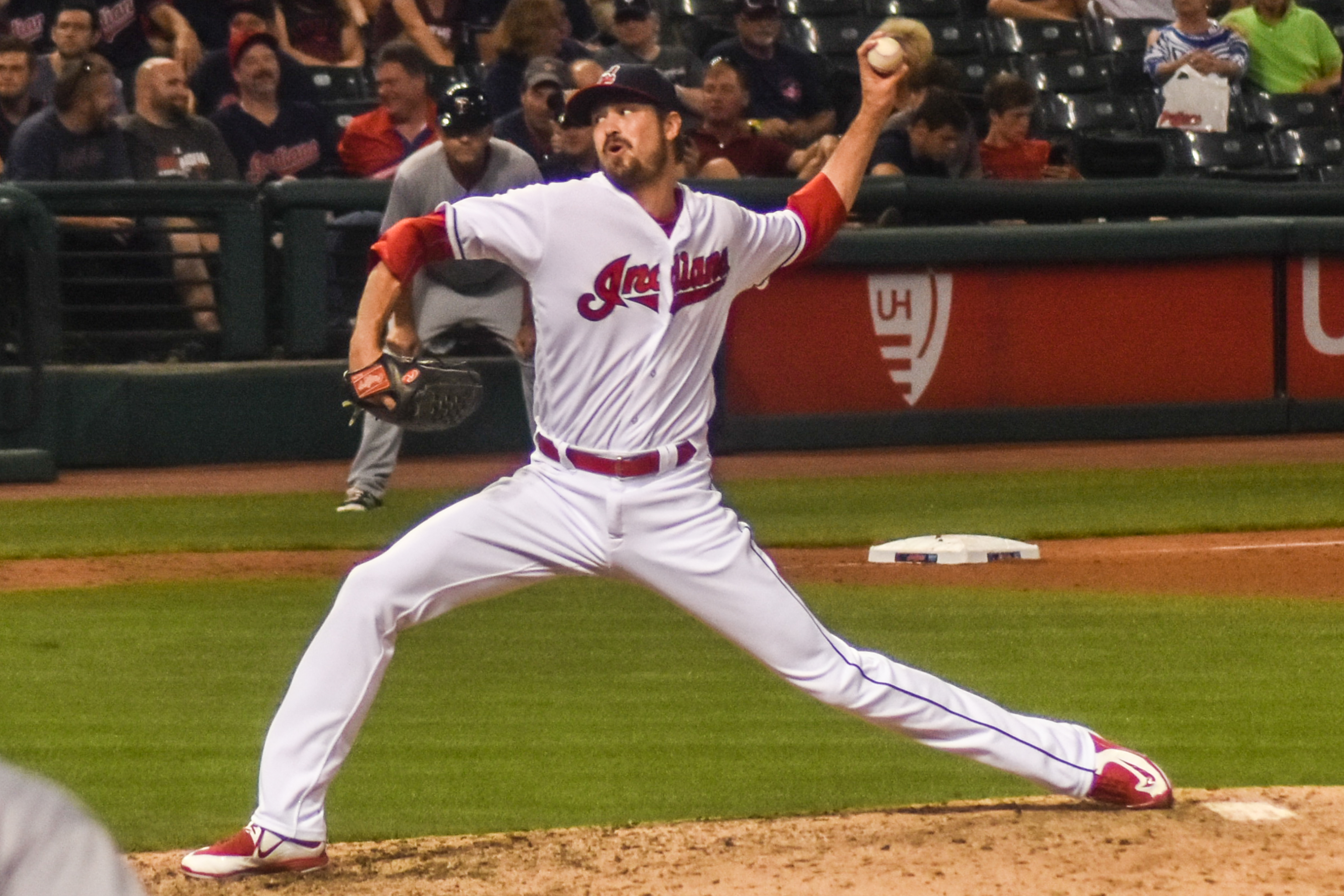
CCBL Hall of Famer Andrew Miller won the league's Outstanding Pro Prospect Award in 2005

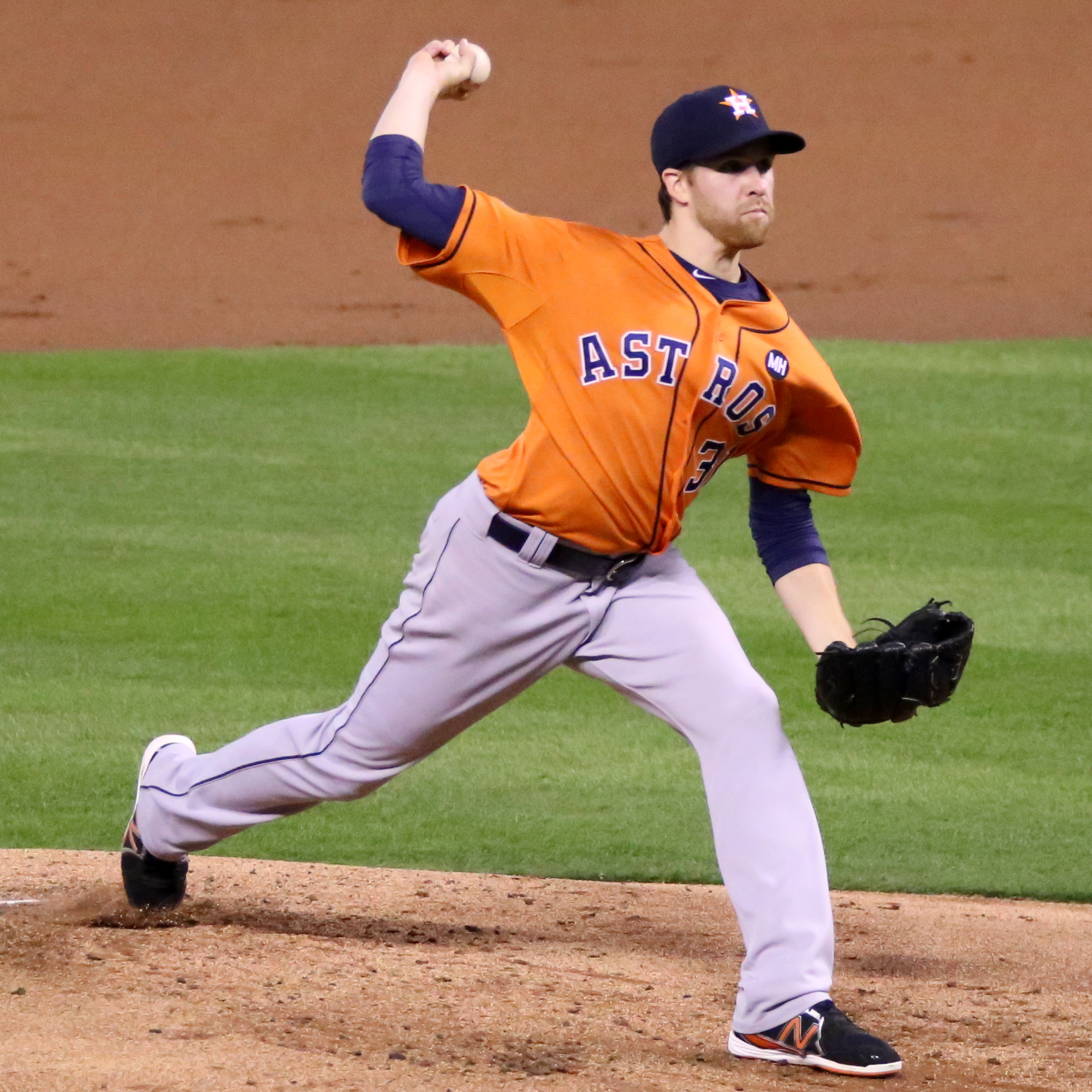
Collin McHugh, Chatham 2007

=== Results by season, 1923–1931 ===
Year	Won	Lost	Regular Season Finish	Postseason*	Manager	Ref
1923	5	7	2nd League (T)		George Temple	
1924	7	17	4th League			
1925					Harold Goodnough	
1926	12	19	4th League		Chucker Roach	
1927^{†}	16	20	4th League		Frank Davies	
1928^{†}	22	22	3rd League		Robert Cushman	
1929^{†}	23	21	2nd League		Johnny Mitchell	
1930	27	17	2nd League		Pete Herman	
1931	22	28	4th League		Pete Herman	

* There were no postseason playoffs during the period 1923–1931. The regular season pennant winner was simply crowned as the league champion.
^{†} Played from 1927 to 1929 as combined "Chatham-Harwich" team

=== Results by season, 1946–1962 ===
Year	Won	Lost	Regular Season Finish*	Postseason	Manager	Ref
1946					Merrill Doane	
1947					Merrill Doane	
1948				Lost semi-finals (Orleans)	Merrill Doane	
1949					George Temple	
1950	16	27	7th Lower Cape Division			
1951	22	13	2nd Lower Cape Division (A); 4th Lower Cape Division (B)			
1952						
1953	20	15	3rd Lower Cape Division (A); T-3rd Lower Cape Division (B)			
1954						
1955	3	26	7th Lower Cape Division			
1956	10	23	6th Lower Cape Division			
1957	7	25	6th Lower Cape Division			
1958	9	21	6th Lower Cape Division			
1959	11	21	5th Lower Cape Division			
1960	12	20	5th Lower Cape Division			
1961	7	24	5th Lower Cape Division		Ed Nickerson	
1962	21	9	1st Lower Cape Division	Won round 1 (Yarmouth); Lost semi-finals (Harwich)	John Carroll	

* Regular seasons split into first and second halves are designated as (A) and (B).

=== Results by season, 1963–present ===
Year	Won	Lost	Tied	Regular Season Finish	Postseason	Manager
1963	28	6	0	1st Lower Cape Division	Lost semi-finals (Orleans)	John Carroll
1964	27	4	0	1st Lower Cape Division	Lost championship (Cotuit)	Bill "Lefty" Lefebvre
1965	25	7	0	1st Lower Cape Division	Lost championship (Sagamore)	Joe "Skip" Lewis
1966	30	4	0	1st Lower Cape Division	Lost championship (Falmouth)	Joe "Skip" Lewis
1967	30	9	0	1st Lower Cape Division	Won semi-finals (Orleans); Won championship (Falmouth)	Joe "Skip" Lewis
1968	17	23	0	3rd Lower Cape Division		Joe "Skip" Lewis
1969	29	15	0	1st Lower Cape Division	Won semi-finals (Orleans); Lost championship (Falmouth)	Joe "Skip" Lewis
1970	21	20	0	5th League		Doug Holmquist
1971	18	22	2	5th League		Ben Hays
1972	25	17	0	4th League	Won semi-finals (Orleans); Lost championship (Cotuit)	Ben Hays
1973	26	14	1	1st League	Lost semi-finals (Yarmouth)	Ben Hays
1974	19	23	0	5th League		Ben Hays
1975	16	25	1	6th League		Joe Russo
1976	30	11	1	1st League	Won semi-finals (Hyannis); Lost championship (Wareham)	Ed Lyons
1977	25	16	1	2nd League	Lost semi-finals (Y-D)	Ed Lyons
1978	25	17	0	2nd League	Lost semi-finals (Harwich)	Ed Lyons
1979	19	21	2	4th League	Lost semi-finals (Hyannis)	Ed Lyons
1980	29	13	0	1st League	Won semi-finals (Wareham); Lost championship (Falmouth)	Ed Lyons
1981	15	27	0	8th League		Ed Lyons
1982	20	21	1	4th League	Won semi-finals (Wareham); Won championship (Hyannis)	Ed Lyons
1983	15	25	2	7th League		John Mayotte
1984	18	23	1	6th League		John Mayotte
1985	31	10	1	1st League	Won semi-finals (Orleans); Lost championship (Cotuit)	John Mayotte
1986	22	19	1	4th League	Lost semi-finals (Orleans)	John Mayotte
1987	17	25	0	6th League (T)		John Mayotte
1988	19	24	0	4th East Division		Bob Whalen
1989	22	20	2	2nd East Division (T)	Lost play-in game (Brewster)	Bob Whalen
1990	17	24	2	5th East Division		Rich Hill
1991	24	19	1	1st East Division	Won semi-finals (Orleans); Lost championship (Hyannis)	Rich Hill
1992	31	11	0	1st East Division	Won semi-finals (Brewster); Won championship (Cotuit)	Rich Hill
1993	25	19	0	1st East Division	Lost semi-finals (Orleans)	Rich Hill; John Schiffner
1994	16	25	2	4th East Division		John Schiffner
1995	25	17	1	1st East Division	Won semi-finals (Orleans); Lost championship (Cotuit)	John Schiffner
1996	22	21	1	2nd East Division	Won semi-finals (Brewster); Won championship (Falmouth)	John Schiffner
1997	22	22	0	2nd East Division	Lost semi-finals (Harwich)	John Schiffner
1998	23	18	2	2nd East Division	Won semi-finals (Brewster); Won championship (Wareham)	John Schiffner
1999	30	14	0	1st East Division	Won semi-finals (Orleans); Lost championship (Cotuit)	John Schiffner
2000	23	20	1	2nd East Division (T)	Won play-in game (Orleans); Lost semi-finals (Brewster)	John Schiffner
2001	25	19	0	1st East Division (T)	Won semi-finals (Y-D); Lost championship (Wareham)	John Schiffner
2002	19	23	2	5th East Division		John Schiffner
2003	22	21	1	3rd East Division		John Schiffner
2004	21	23	0	4th East Division		John Schiffner
2005	28	15	1	2nd East Division	Lost semi-finals (Orleans)	John Schiffner
2006	21	22	1	4th East Division		John Schiffner
2007	25	16	3	2nd East Division	Lost semi-finals (Y-D)	John Schiffner
2008	19	25	0	4th East Division		John Schiffner
2009	21	23	0	3rd East Division	Lost play-in game (Orleans)	John Schiffner
2010	20	22	2	5th East Division		John Schiffner
2011	15	28	1	5th East Division		John Schiffner
2012	21	21	2	3rd East Division	Lost round 1 (Y-D)	John Schiffner
2013	26	17	1	1st East Division	Won round 1 (Y-D); Lost semi-finals (Orleans)	John Schiffner
2014	17	26	1	5th East Division		John Schiffner
2015	22	22	0	3rd East Division (T)	Lost round 1 (Orleans)	John Schiffner
2016	17	26	1	4th East Division	Won round 1 (Harwich); Lost semi-finals (Y-D)	John Schiffner
2017	21	23	0	4th East Division	Lost round 1 (Orleans)	John Schiffner
2018	22	19	3	2nd East Division	Won round 1 (Harwich); Won semi-finals (Brewster); Lost championship (Wareham)	Tom Holliday
2019	24	18	2	1st East Division	Lost round 1 (Harwich)	Tom Holliday
2020	Season cancelled due to coronavirus pandemic					
2021	16	19	3	4th East Division		Tom Holliday
2022	15	20	9	5th East Division		Tom Holliday
2023	15	27	2	4th East Division (T)		Tom Holliday; Marty Lees; Todd Shelton
2024	20	20	0	2nd East Division	Lost round 1 (Harwich)	Jeremy Sheetinger; Eric Beattie
2025	17	20	3	5th East Division		Dennis Cook
2026	19	18	3	4th East Division	Lost round 1 (Y-D)	Dennis Cook

== League award winners ==
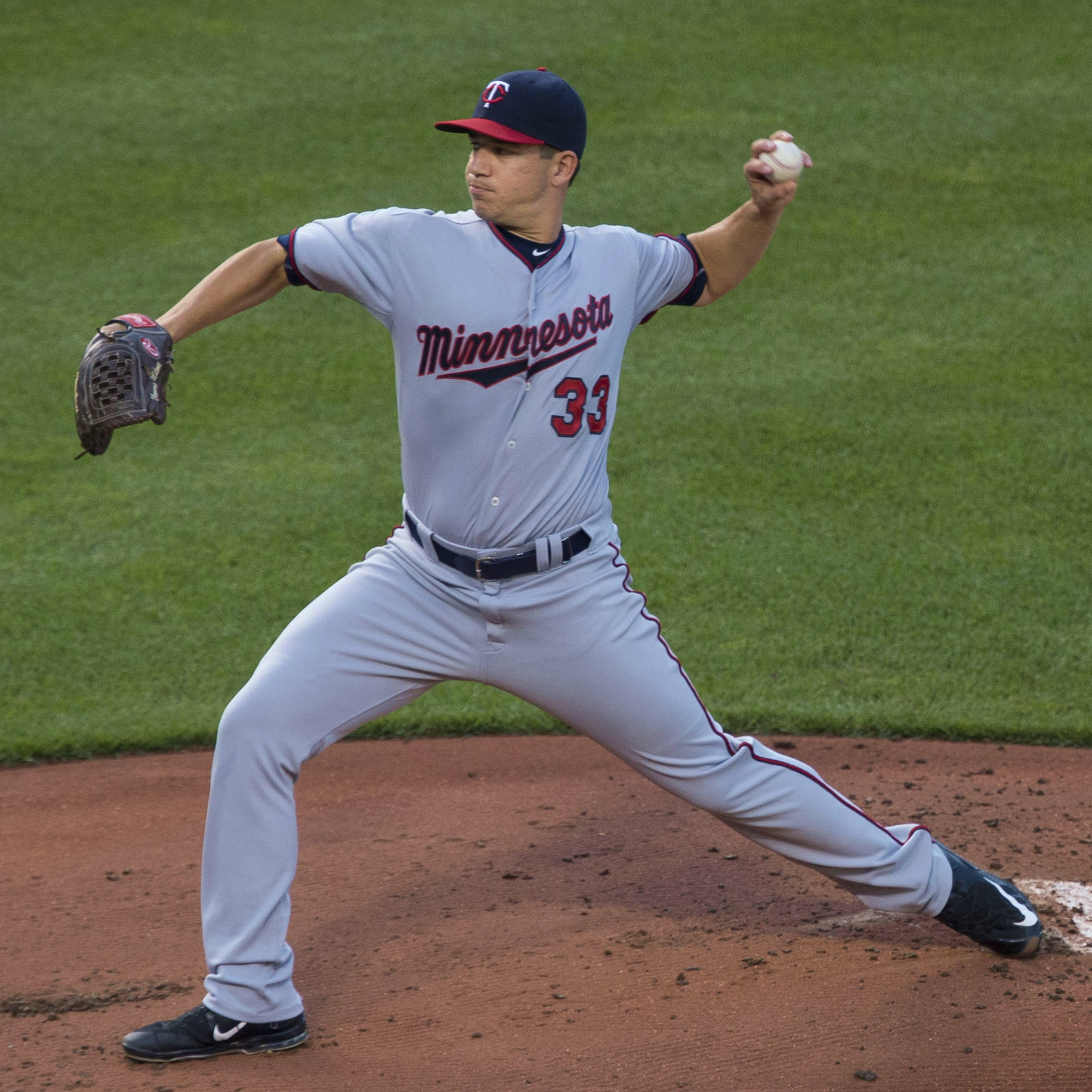
Tom Milone was the CCBL's Outstanding Pitcher in 2007

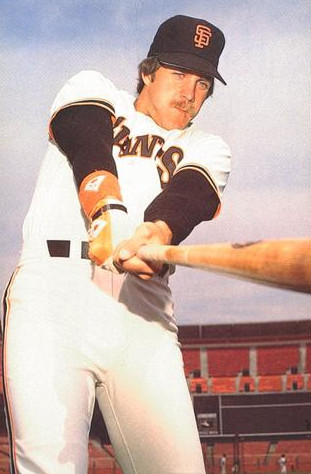
Dave Bergman wore the CCBL batting crown in 1973

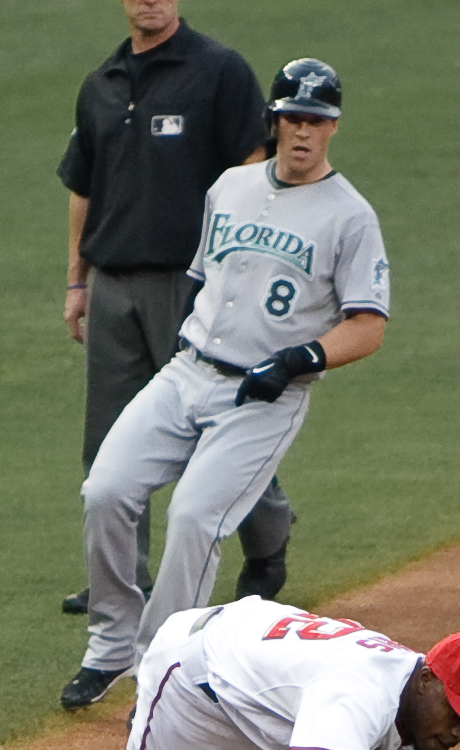
Chris Coghlan was CCBL batting champ in 2005

The Pat Sorenti MVP Award
Year	Player
1967	Thurman Munson
1984	Joey Cora
2005	Evan Longoria

The Robert A. McNeece Outstanding Pro Prospect Award
Year	Player
1976	Steve Taylor*
1982	Gary Kanwisher
1991	Derek Wallace
1996	Matt Anderson
1998	Kyle Snyder
2005	Andrew Miller
2008	Grant Green

The BFC Whitehouse Outstanding Pitcher Award
Year	Player
1966	Joe Jabar
1967	Joe Jabar
1973	John Caneira
1976	Mickey O'Connor
1979	Walt Terrell
1995	Jason Ramsey*
1999	Rik Currier*
2000	Dan Krines*
2005	Andrew Miller*
2007	Tom Milone
2013	Lukas Schiraldi
2026	Angel Cervantes

The Russ Ford Outstanding Relief Pitcher Award
Year	Player
1992	Scott Smith
1998	Tim Lavigne
1999	Derrick DePriest
2002	Zane Carlson*

The Daniel J. Silva Sportsmanship Award
Year	Player
1976	Joe Gurascio
1977	Russ Quetti
1981	Jim Sherman*
1986	Jim DePalo
1993	Paul Ottavinia
2013	Connor Joe
2025	Daniel Jackson
2026	Rob Rispoli

The Manny Robello 10th Player Award
Year	Player
1986	Scott Coolbaugh
1996	Jermaine Clark
2014	A.J. Murray

The John J. Claffey Outstanding New England Player Award
Year	Player
2003	Chris Lambert
2013	Tommy Lawrence
2014	Chris Shaw

The Thurman Munson Award for Batting Champion
Year	Player
1963	Ken Voges (.505)
1966	Tom Weir (.420)
1967	Thurman Munson (.420)
1971	Ken Doria (.346)
1973	Dave Bergman (.341)
1985	Tim McIntosh (.392)
2005	Chris Coghlan (.346)

All-Star Game MVP Award
Year	Player
1976	Steve Taylor
1998	Matt Cepicky
2002	Tim Stauffer
2008	Grant Green
2013	J. D. Davis
2014	A.J. Murray

All-Star Home Run Hitting Contest Champion
Year	Player
1998	Matt Cepicky
2011	Richie Shaffer
2022	Lyle Miller-Green

The Star of Stars Playoff MVP Award
Year	Player
1992	Steve Duda
1996	Jermaine Clark*
1996	Keith Evans*
1998	Matt Cepicky*
1998	Ryan Earey*

(*) - Indicates co-recipient

== All-Star Game selections ==
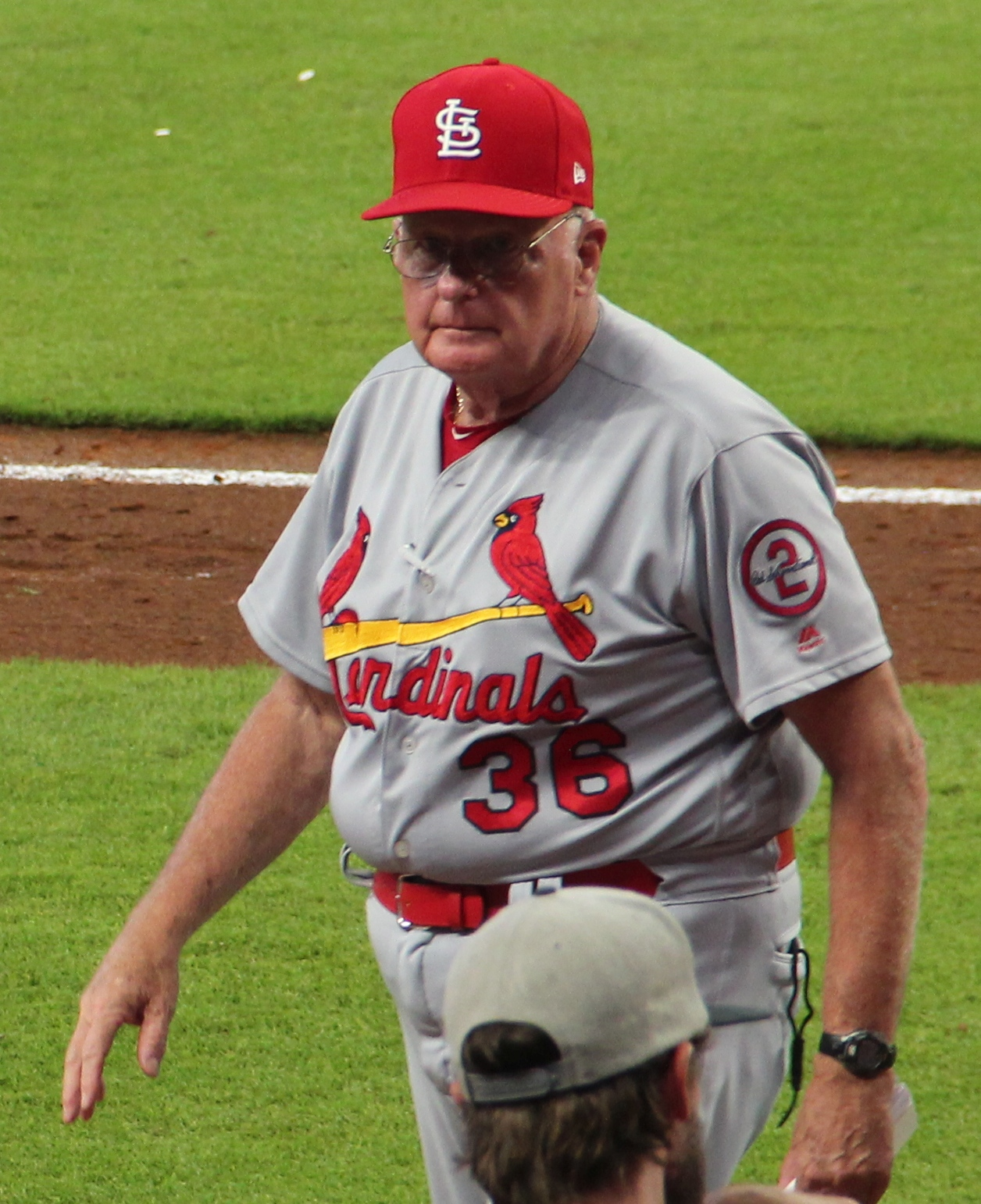
CCBL Hall of Famer and 1966 all-star George Greer

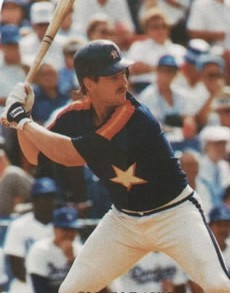
CCBL Hall of Famer Glenn Davis, 1980 Chatham all-star

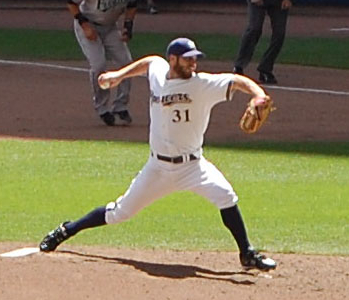
CCBL Hall of Famer David Bush was an all-star for Chatham in 2000 and 2001.

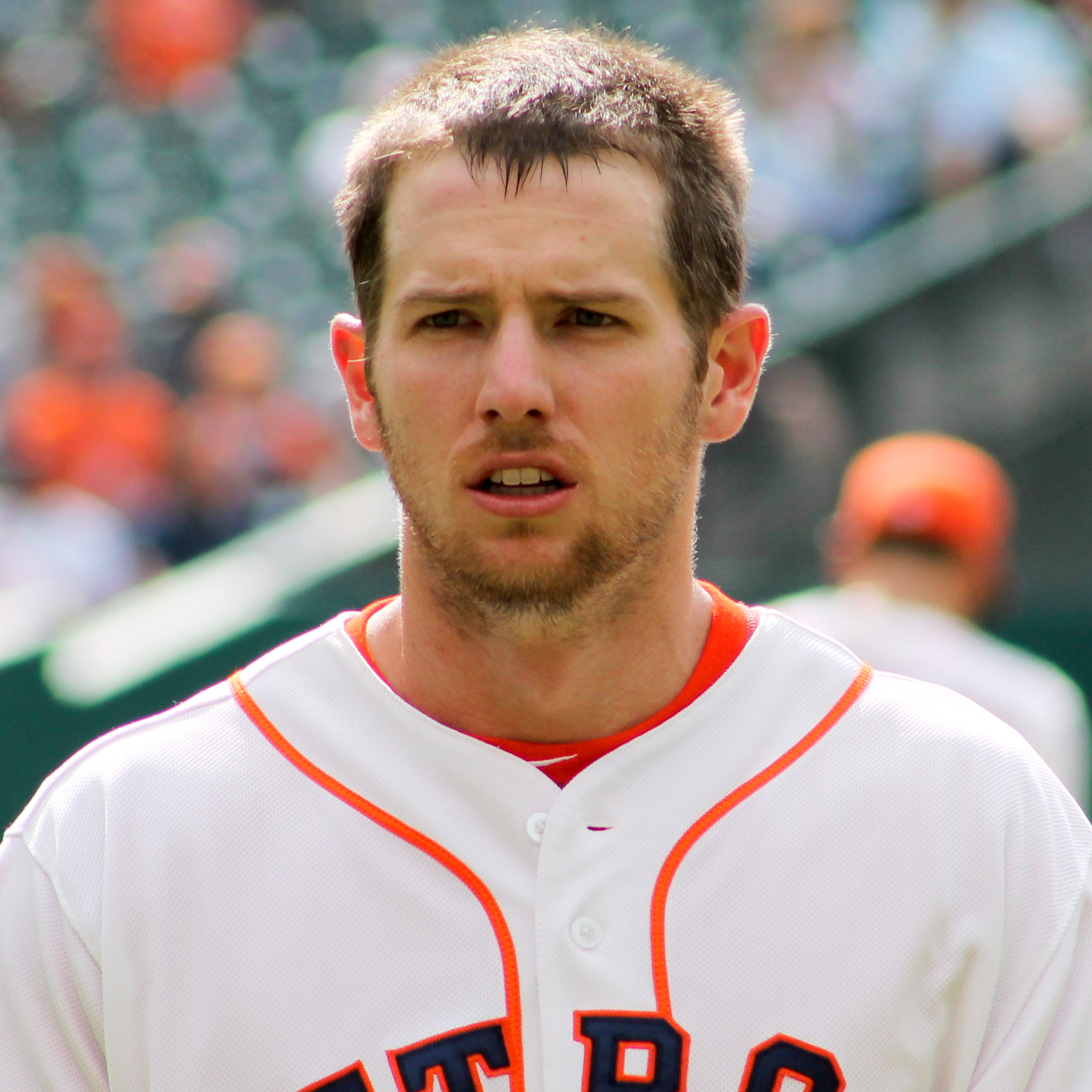
2005 Chatham all-star Alex Presley

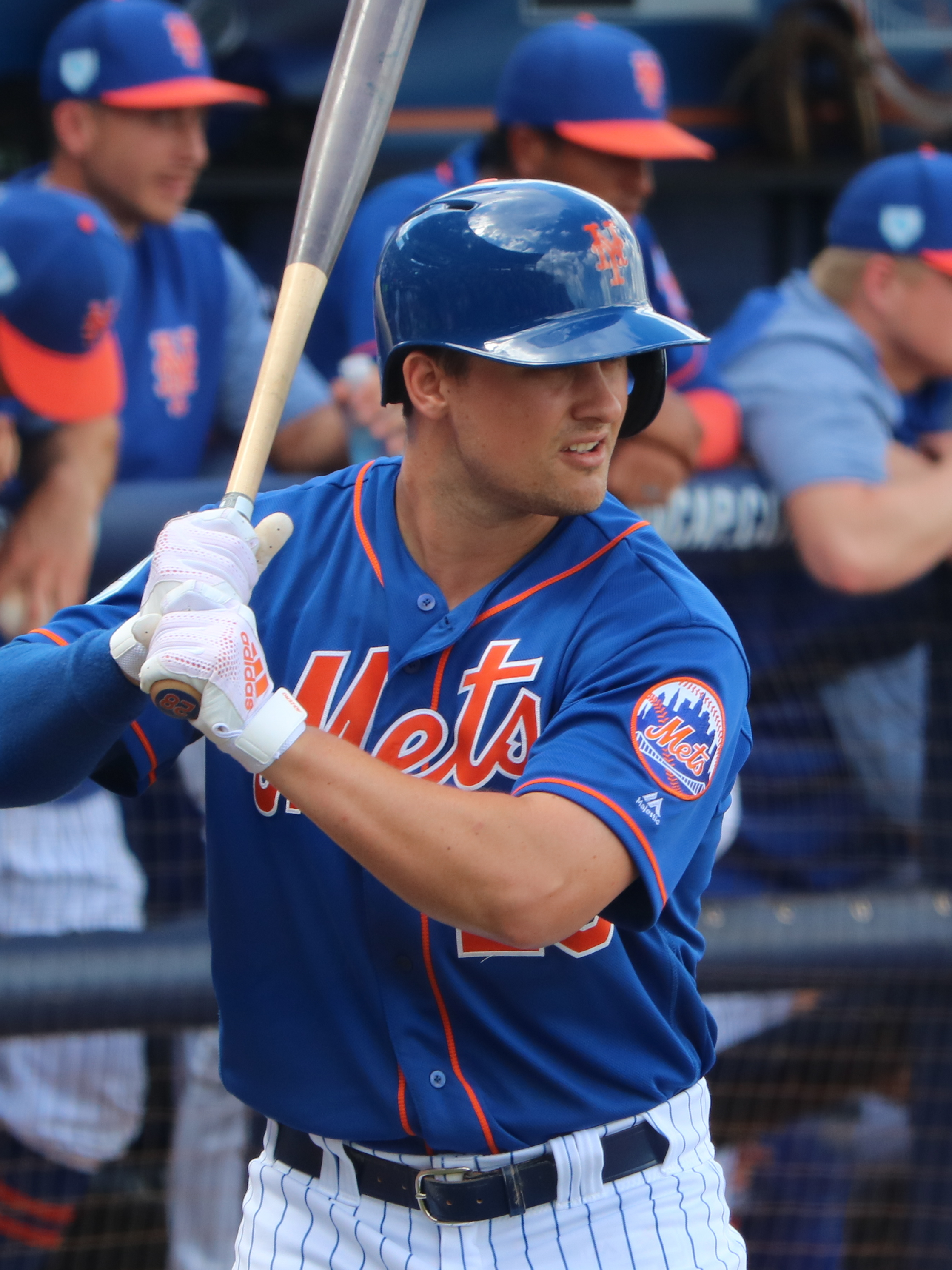
The Anglers' J. D. Davis was East Division MVP of the 2013 CCBL All-Star Game

Year	Players	Ref
1963	Jerry Pardue, Gerry Mackin, Mike Rose, Paul Callahan, Steve Karp, Ken Voges, Tony Grzywacz, Mike Knox	
1964	Steve Saradnik, Robert Constant, Charlie Hough, Edward Carroll, Bill Cheslock, Edward Berube, Donald Phillips	
1965	Steve Saradnik, George Greer, Charles Malitz, Bob Welz, Paul Mikus, Ronald Knowe, Kenneth Hall, Jon Susce	
1966	Steve Saradnik, George Greer, Ed Baird, Tom Grieve, Mike Rosenfelt, Tom Weir, Joe Jabar	
1967	Steve Saradnik, Ed Baird, Dave Baldwin, Thurman Munson, Gary Lautzenhiser	
1968	Randy Mohler, Charles Schmidt, James Brunette, John Hurley	
1969	Joe Keenan, Dave Prest, Jim Clouser, Hank Bunnell, Bruce Raible	
1970	Kirk Maas, Gary Boyce, Don Robinson, Dave Landers	
1971	John Ihlenburg, Scott Rahl, Ken Doria	
1972	John Ihlenburg, Mitch Nowicki, Randy Kersten, Tom McMillan	
1973	Mitch Nowicki, John Caneira, Steve Cline, Fred Stewart, Dave Bergman, Bobby Hrapmann, Hank Sauer Jr.	
1974	Dan O'Brien, Chuck Rogers, Dave Lundstedt, Lloyd Thompson, Ray Boyer	
1975	Mickey O'Connor, Joe Guarascio, Jesse Wright, Gerry McKiernan, Ray Boyer, Ken Bolek	
1976	Mickey O'Connor, Joe Guarascio, Russ Quetti, George Gross, Steve Taylor, Jim Sherrill, Jim Tracy	
1977	Bill Steidl, Bob Bonnette, Jim Lauer	
1978	Jeff Groth, Ricky Horton	
1979	Walt Terrell, Mike Stenhouse	
1980	Glenn Davis, Jim Parks, Tom Mohl, Rob O'Connor	
1981	Jim Sherman	
1982	Greg Schuler	
1983	Roy Silver	
1984	Joey Cora, Scott Shaw	
1985	Scott Coolbaugh, Jim DePalo, Jorge Robles, Dave Hartnett	
1986	Scott Coolbaugh, Jim DePalo, Albert Belle	
1987	(None)	
1988	Brian Dour, Jeff Bagwell	
1989	Barry Miller, Steve Gill, Huck Flener, Rick Huisman, Mike Daniel	
1990	Lamarr Rogers, Jack Nickell, Mike Grohs, Rich Moody	
1991	Steve Duda, Lamarr Rogers, Jamie Taylor, Doug Newstrom, Todd Steverson	
1992	Steve Duda, Scott Vollmer, Greg Norton, Keith Grunewald, Jeremy Carr, Scott Smith, Harry Berrios	
1993	Paul Ottavinia, J. P. Roberge, Jim Telgheder, Jess Gonzalez, Mike Mitchell, Scott Pinoni	
1994	Mike Lowell, Mike Galati, Ken Vining, Gabe Alvarez	
1995	Jerome Alviso, Jason Koehler, Keith Evans, Jason Ramsey, Seth Etherton, Chris Combs	
1996	Scott Friedholm, Jermaine Clark, Mike Colangelo, Jason Fitzgerald, Matt Purkiss, Chris Combs	
1997	Matt White, Peter Fisher, Derek Wathan, Sean Mahoney	
1998	Rik Currier, Todd Raithel, Jeremy Ward, Matt Cepicky	
1999	Rik Currier, Dan Moylan, David DeJesus, Seth Davidson, Shaun Stokes, Scott Barber, Derrick DePriest	
2000	Dave Bush, Dan Krines, Todd Linden	
2001	Dave Bush, Mike McCoy, Daniel Moore	
2002	Jeremy Cleveland, Tim Stauffer	
2003	Ryan Klosterman, Glenn Swanson, Jeff Frazier, Zane Carlson	
2004	Andrew Miller, Chris Getz, Ryan Mullins, Kyle Bono, Steven Head	
2005	Andrew Miller, Evan Longoria, Chris Coghlan, Baron Frost, Alex Presley, Jared Hughes, Robert Woodard, Derrick Lutz, Josh Morris	
2006	Chris Carrara, Reid Fronk, Ricky Hargrove, Paul Koss, Matt Rizzotti	
2007	Jermaine Curtis, Allan Dykstra, Kevin Couture	
2008	Grant Green, Cory Olson, Brad Boxberger, Sammy Solis	
2009	Mike Murray, Russell Brewer	
2010	Aaron Westlake, Joe Pavon, Derek Self, Logan Verrett, Rick Oropesa	
2011	Dane Phillips, Matt Koch, Richie Shaffer	
2012	Andrew Knapp, Ryan Thompson, Michael Wagner	
2013	Dante Flores, Connor Joe, Matt Gage, J. D. Davis	
2014	A.J. Murray, Jordan Hillyer, Ty Moore, Nick Collins, Kyle Davis, Chris Shaw	
2015	Aaron Knapp, Brandon Miller, Aaron McGarity, Parker Dunshee, Will Craig	
2016	Gunnar Troutwine, Isaac Mattson, Pat Mathis	
2017	Shea Langeliers, Jacob Olson, Josh Shaw, Jeremy Peña, Jack Degroat	
2018	Dan Hammer, John Rave, Tristin English, Troy Miller, Greg Veliz, Blake Sabol, Spencer Torkelson	
2019	Jamal O'Guinn II, Kolby Kubichek, Dawson Merryman, Brady Smith, Jorge Arenas, Kaden Polcovich	
2020	Season cancelled due to coronavirus pandemic	
2021	Joshua Rivera	
2022	Jake DeLeo, Marcus Brown, Caden Grice, Ben Hampton, Alex McFarlane, Lyle Miller-Green	
2023	Aiden Jimenez, Kaeden Kent, Nolan Schubart	
2024	Ashton Larson, Aiva Arquette, Ike Irish, Gabe Van Emon	
2025	Ashton Larson, Jackson Freeman, Josh Swink, Daniel Jackson	
2026	Angel Cervantes, Tommy Goodin, Max Luzarraga, Rob Rispoli, Bino Watters, Junior Laukai	

Italics - Indicates All-Star Game Home Run Hitting Contest participant (1988 to present)

== No-hit games ==
Year	Pitcher	Opponent	Score	Location	Notes	Ref
1948	Bob Johnson	Yarmouth	5–0			
1950	Charlie Jones	Harwich Cape Verdeans	9–0			
1957	Jerry Glynn	Dennis	7–0			
1962	Frank Kashita	Yarmouth	6–0	Simpkins Field		
1964	Fran Walsh	Sagamore	5–0	Keith Field		
1966	Don Wieland	Yarmouth	10–0	Veterans Field	5-inning game	
1967	Don Gabriel	Harwich	6–1	Veterans Field	Caught by Thurman Munson	
1973	Fred Stewart	Harwich	2–1	Whitehouse Field		
1991	Steve Duda	Y-D	5–0	Red Wilson Field		

== Managerial history ==
Manager	Seasons	Total Seasons	Championship Seasons
John Carroll	1962–1963	2	
Bill "Lefty" Lefebvre	1964	1	
Joe "Skip" Lewis	1965–1969	5	1967
Doug Holmquist	1970	1	
Ben Hays	1971–1974	4	
Joe Russo	1975	1	
Ed Lyons	1976–1982	7	1982
John Mayotte	1983–1987	5	
Bob Whalen	1988–1989	2	
Rich Hill	1990–1993	4	1992
John Schiffner	1993–2017	25	1996, 1998
Tom Holliday	2018–2023	5*	
Marty Lees^{†} Todd Shelton^{‡}	2023	1	
Jeremy Sheetinger; Eric Beattie^{‡}	2024	1	
Dennis Cook	2025–2026	2	

(*) - Season count excludes 2020 CCBL season cancelled due to coronavirus pandemic.

(†) - Indicates acting manager

(‡) - Indicates interim manager

=== John Schiffner, one of the Cape League's all-time winningest skippers ===
Chatham boasts one of the winningest managers in Cape Cod Baseball League history in John Schiffner, affectionately known as "Schiff" across amateur baseball. Schiffner retired after his 25th year managing the Chatham A's in 2017, and served as either the team's manager or an assistant coach for 34 total seasons. Schiffner joined legendary Chatham manager Ed Lyons as an assistant coach just two years after graduating from Providence College. While at Providence, Schiffner had spent three summers playing in the Cape League for the Harwich Mariners from 1974 to 1976. After being drafted and playing part of a minor league season in the Pittsburgh Pirates organization in 1977, Schiffner returned to the Cape as an Assistant Coach in Harwich for the summer. During the 1977 playoffs, A's Manager Ed Lyons approached Schiffner and invited him to join his staff for the following summer, and Schiffner quickly accepted the offer.

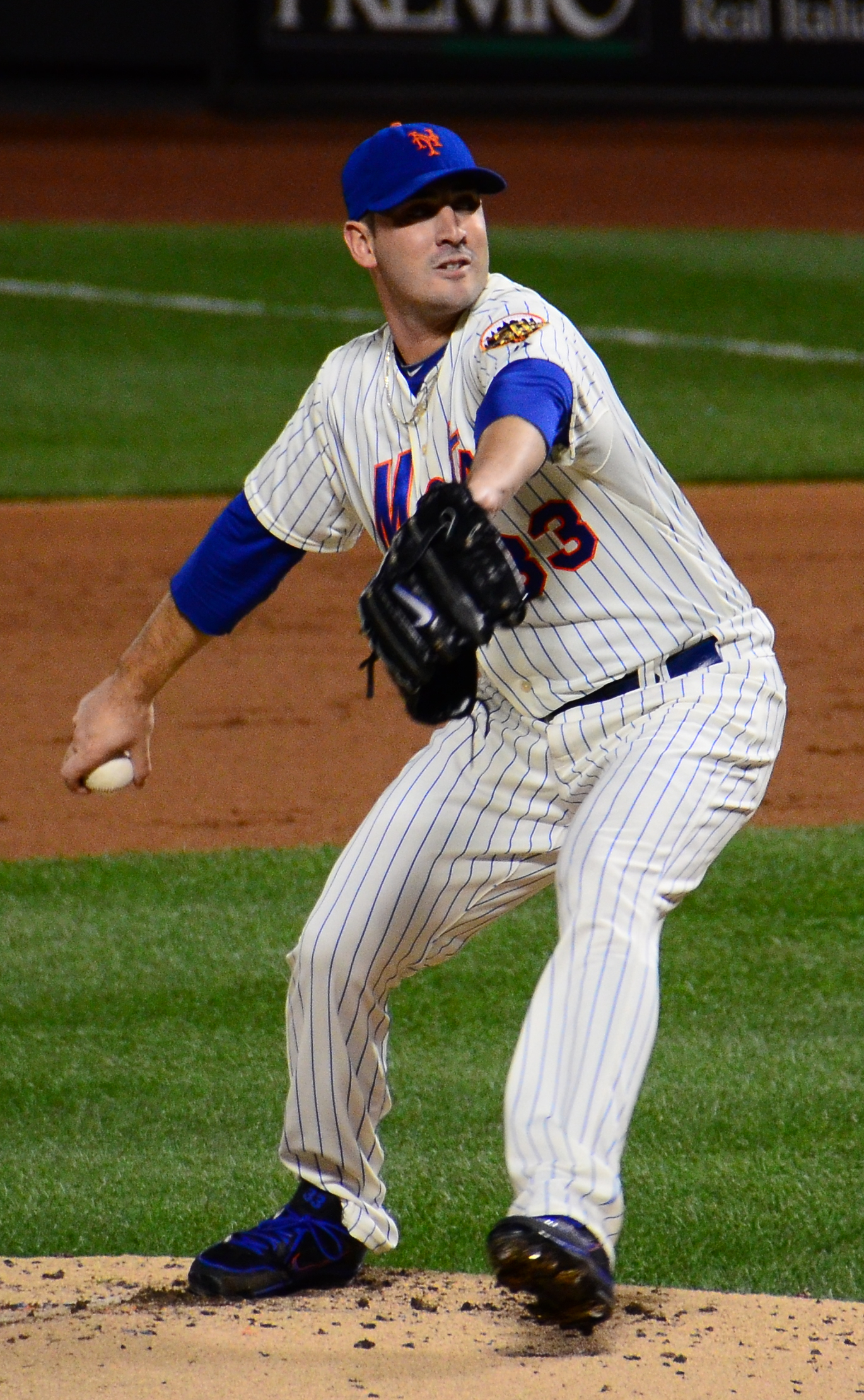
Matt Harvey pitched against Coach Schiffner in high school, then played for him in Chatham

Schiffner served as an Assistant Coach under Lyons in Chatham from 1978 to 1982, then returned in 1990 in the same role after a stint scouting for the Montreal Expos. Schiffner became the Chatham A's manager on July 7, 1993, when manager Rich Hill accepted the head coaching position at the University of San Francisco and took his new post immediately. Schiffner took over a last place team more than halfway into the season, but oversaw a stunning 16-7 record down the stretch as the A's claimed a first-place finish and Schiffner was offered the position of manager on a permanent basis, a major breakthrough for him after a significant number of unsuccessful managerial interviews in Chatham and elsewhere around the Cape League in previous years.

Including that 1993 campaign, Schiffner managed the A's for 25 years, stepping down at the end of the 2017 Cape Cod Baseball League season. He managed the A's to CCBL championships in 1996 and 1998, and became widely regarded as the face and voice of Cape Cod Baseball.

Schiffner announced that the 2017 season would be his last after a Chatham Anglers game in Harwich in July 2017. Soon after, he revealed that he was leaving Chatham to become an assistant coach at the University of Maine, where he would work with new Maine head coach Nick Derba, the catcher of the powerful 2005 Chatham A's team and one of Schiffner's favorite former players. Schiffner had previously served as the volunteer assistant coach at Maine during the 2013 season, when Derba was the Black Bears' hitting coach under current Stetson University head coach Steve Trimper. On August 10, 2017, the Chatham Athletic Association announced that former Oklahoma State University head baseball coach Tom Holliday would succeed Schiffner, beginning with the 2018 Cape Cod Baseball League season.

Schiffner also served as the head baseball coach for 33 years at Plainfield High School in Plainfield, Connecticut, where he also taught history for over three decades. He is the winningest coach in Connecticut state high school baseball history, and often spotted future Cape League talent on high school fields across the state, including current Major League pitchers Matt Harvey and Dominic Leone, both of whom pitched against Schiffner's teams in high school and went on to play for him in Chatham before reaching the Majors. Schiffner was inducted into the Connecticut High School Coaches' Association Hall of Fame in November 2017.

== Internship program ==
The Chatham Athletic Association offers internships in Sports Business and Sports Media. Students majoring in sport management, business, marketing, and accounting/finance are mentored on sports-business processes including trend analysis, inventory management, profitability analysis, and marketing projects.

== Live broadcasts ==
In 2003, Chatham became the first Cape Cod Baseball League team to start broadcasting games, and has received national attention as a training grounds for young broadcasters. The Anglers provide live broadcasts for all 44 regular season games in addition to the playoffs. All home games have a live video and audio stream while road games are audio only. Viewers can find the live video and audio stream by visiting the Broadcast Central page of the Anglers website. Fans can also listen by calling TRZ Teamline toll free to for all broadcasts 1-800-846-4700, code 3841. In 2023, Chatham became the first Cape Cod Baseball League team to broadcast its games over FM radio when it announced that all home games would be available on 89.9 FM within two miles of Veterans Field.

Below is a list of those who have served as broadcast announcers for the A's.

- Guy Benson (Northwestern University) 2003–2006
- Dan D'Uva (Syracuse University, Fordham University) 2003–2008
- Kyle Whitehead (Northwestern University) 2007
- Mike Toper (Syracuse University) 2007
- Brian Clark (Fordham University) 2008, 2009
- Scott Braun (University of Miami) 2009, 2010
- Aaron Canada (George Mason University) 2010, 2011
- Chris Fitzgerald (University of Oregon) 2011, 2012
- Brandon Liebhaber (Northwestern University) 2012, 2013
- Keith Zubrow (Syracuse University) 2013
- Jonny Wincott (Syracuse University) 2014, 2015
- Dom Cotroneo (Arizona State University) 2014, 2015
- Jake Eisenberg (University of Maryland) 2016
- Evan Stockton (Syracuse University) 2016
- Drew Carter (Syracuse University) 2017
- Max Herz (Vanderbilt University) 2017
- Josh Schaefer (Arizona State University) 2018, 2019
- Cooper Boardman (Syracuse University) 2018, 2019
- Emmanuel Berbari (Fordham University) 2021
- Ben Shulman (Syracuse University) 2021
- Joe Puccio (Syracuse University) 2022, 2023
- Ian Unsworth (Syracuse University) 2022
- Andrew Selover (Syracuse University) 2023, 2024
- Jack Smith (University of Southern California) 2024
- Hudson Ridley (Syracuse University) 2025
- Jake Klein (Syracuse University) 2025, 2026
- Chase Abrams (University of Rhode Island) 2026

== In popular culture ==
=== Summer Catch (2001, Movie) ===
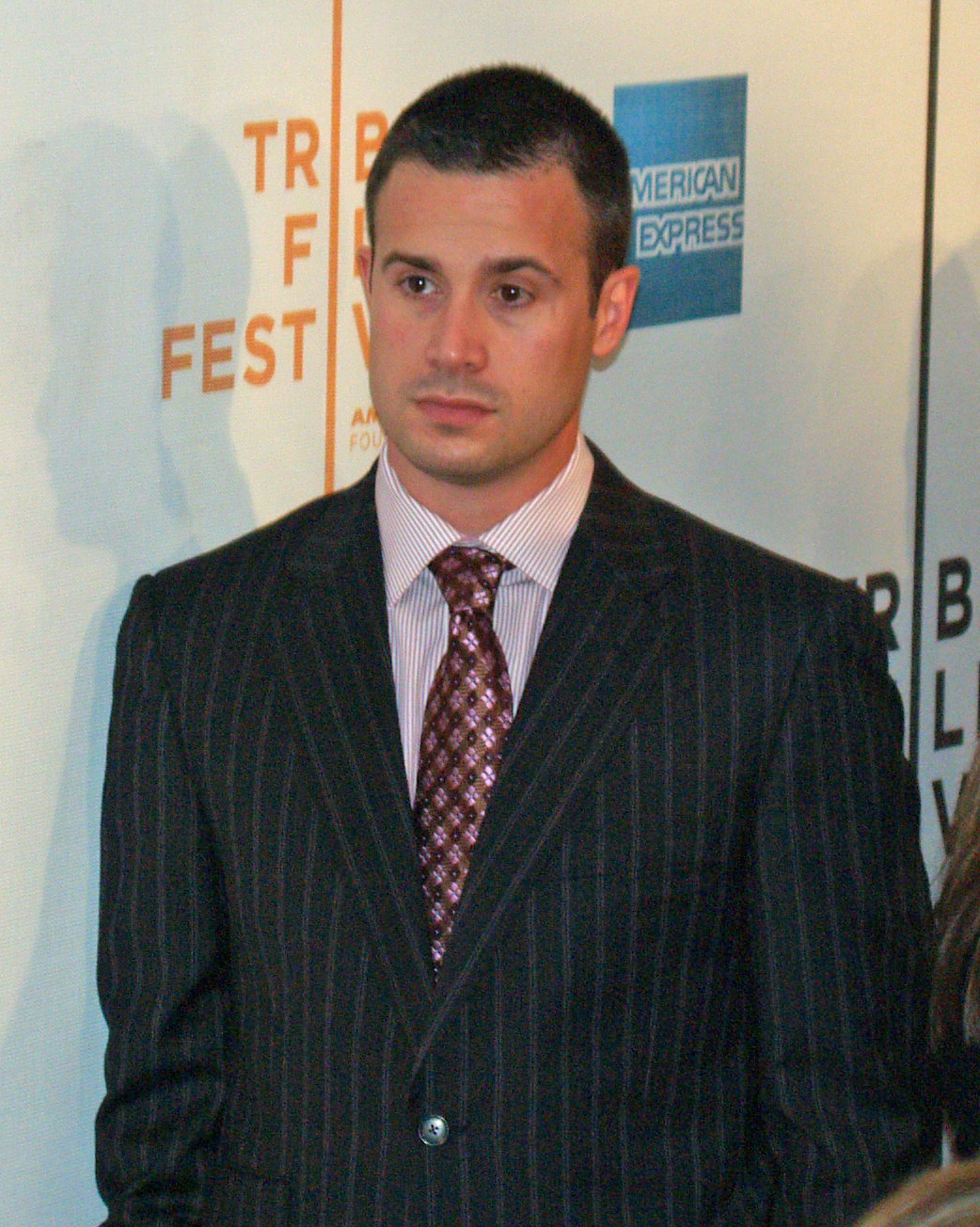
Freddie Prinze Jr., star of the movie Summer Catch

The Chatham A's were featured prominently in the 2001 Warner Bros. motion picture Summer Catch, starring Freddy Prinze Jr. and Jessica Biel, a comedic sports movie depicting fictional ballplayers spending a summer in Chatham filled with baseball and booze. Though the movie is an extreme fictionalization, some of the fictional players are loosely based on past A's players, and real life A's manager John Schiffner is the fictional team's coach, as portrayed by actor Brian Dennehy. The majority of the movie was filmed in South Carolina, though small portions of scenic shots were taken in Chatham at Veterans Field. The A's actual logos, colors, and uniforms are used in the movie, along with loose copies of other Cape Cod Baseball League team names, logos, and colors.

=== The Last Best League (2004, Book) ===
Jim Collins' The Last Best League (2004, ISBN 0-306-81418-8) is a non-fiction account of the 2002 Chatham A's, which featured infielder Jamie D'Antona and manager John Schiffner as the book's protagonists. Collins follows and recounts every move the players, coaches, fans, and others make in the ethnographic account of the full 2002 Cape Cod Baseball League and Chatham A's season. The book delves deeply into the life and baseball journey of John Schiffner, who was already the longest-tenured manager in the league and the undisputed face of Cape Cod Baseball at the time of the book's writing, even though he still stood 15 years away from retirement. Schiffner and his longtime assistant coach Matt Fincher are profiled heavily in the book. Fincher was the longtime head baseball coach at University of South Carolina-Upstate.

D'Antona, a highly touted power hitter from Wake Forest University who quickly becomes Collins' primary player focus in the book, is depicted as a laid-back ballplayer whose potential is hindered by occasional lapses in judgment and lack of effort. Collins follows D'Antona extensively both on and off the field, including to his job at the Chatham Fish Pier, where D'Antona delivered fresh fish to businesses all over Chatham at the crack of dawn. Following a short Major League career and a stint playing professionally in Japan, D'Antona returned to Chatham as the Anglers' hitting coach in 2017, working under John Schiffner in his final season as A's manager.

The two members of the 2002 A's who went on to the longest professional baseball careers are Chris Iannetta and Tim Stauffer. A starting pitcher from the University of Richmond, Stauffer was the best pitcher on the 2002 A's and amongst the best in the entire Cape League that summer. He was selected fourth overall by the San Diego Padres in the 2003 MLB draft based largely off his performance on Cape Cod, and pitched in the Major Leagues for 10 seasons. He appeared in 201 MLB games, posting a 3.97 career ERA before retiring after the 2015 season. Iannetta, a catcher who just completed his 12th Major League season in 2017, is not one of the predominant characters in The Last Best League. One of a select few freshman hitters in the Cape League, Iannetta struggled all summer at the plate after his first year at the University of North Carolina, and was not asked back to Chatham the next summer, according to Collins in the book. He was selected in the fourth round of the 2004 MLB draft by the Colorado Rockies, and has played in over 1000 MLB games, including over 900 starts at catcher for four different teams.

== See also ==
- Chatham Anglers players
