= Matt Frisbee =

American baseball player (born 1996)

Free agent
- Pitcher
- Born: November 18, 1996 (age 30); Candler, North Carolina, U.S.
- Bats: Right Throws: Right

Matthew David Frisbee (born November 18, 1996) is an American professional baseball pitcher who is a free agent.

== Amateur career ==
Frisbee was born and grew up in Candler, North Carolina, and attended Enka High School. In 2014 he averaged 1.24 strikeouts per inning. In 2015 he had an ERA of 2.79 in 37 2/3 innings pitched with 50 strikeouts, and batted .385. He was named All-America Honorable Mention, All-Atlantic Region Second Team by Perfect Game, and all-conference his sophomore and junior seasons.

Frisbee played college baseball for the UNC Greensboro Spartans for three seasons. In 2017, he played collegiate summer baseball with the Harwich Mariners of the Cape Cod Baseball League. As a junior, he was named first team All-Southern Conference and the conference Pitcher of the Year after posting a record of 10–2 (his 10 wins tying for the league lead) over 15 starts with a 3.45 ERA and 116 strikeouts (3rd) in 91 1/3 innings pitched (11.4 strikeouts per 9 innings).

== Professional career ==
=== San Francisco Giants ===
Frisbee was drafted by the San Francisco Giants in the 15th round, with the 436th overall selection, of the 2018 Major League Baseball draft. He was assigned to the Low-A Salem-Keizer Volcanoes after signing with the team. Frisbee began the 2019 season with the Single-A Augusta GreenJackets before he was promoted to the San Jose Giants of the High-A California League, where he went 9–8 with a 3.17 ERA in 116 1/3 innings in which he struck out 131 batters (6th in the league) with 1.7 walks and 10.1 strikeouts per 9 innings and was named the team's pitcher of the year.

Frisbee did not play in a game in 2020 due to the cancellation of the minor league season because of the COVID-19 pandemic. Frisbee began the 2021 season with the Double-A Richmond Flying Squirrels, with whom he was 5–4 with a 3.77 ERA and 65 strikeouts. He was promoted to the Triple-A Sacramento River Cats, with whom he was 1–6 with a 7.64 ERA and 46 strikeouts. In 2022 with Richmond, Frisbee was 6–10 with a 5.16 ERA in 27 games (26 starts; 2nd in the league) spanning 139 2/3 innings in which he had 132 strikeouts (4th).

Frisbee split the 2023 campaign between Richmond and Sacramento. In 32 combined appearances out of the bullpen, he logged a 6-0 record and 5.10 ERA with 37 strikeouts across 47 2/3 innings pitched. Frisbee spent 2024 with Richmond and the High-A Eugene Emeralds, accumulating a 2-5 record and 4.57 ERA with 45 strikeouts over 14 total games (9 starts). He elected free agency following the season on November 4, 2024.

=== High Point Rockers ===
On April 16, 2025, Frisbee signed with the High Point Rockers of the Atlantic League of Professional Baseball. However, he was released prior to the start of the season on April 23. On April 28, Frisbee was re-signed by the Rockers. In nine appearances for the team, he struggled to a 2-1 record and 10.13 ERA with 14 strikeouts across 13 1/3 innings pitched. Frisbee was released by High Point on June 8.
