= Chris Manno =

Spanish baseball player (born 1988)

- Pitcher
- Born: 4 November 1988 (age 37); Brooklyn, New York, U.S.
- Bats: Left Throws: Left
- Stats at Baseball Reference

Christopher Manno (born 4 November 1988) is an American former professional baseball pitcher. Born in the United States, he represented Spain internationally.

== Career ==
A native of Brooklyn, New York, Manno attended Xaverian High School and Duke University. While at Duke, Manno played collegiate summer baseball for the Harwich Mariners of the Cape Cod Baseball League, was named a league all-star, and helped lead the team to the league title. The Washington Nationals selected him in the 26th round of the 2010 MLB draft.

On July 27, 2011, Manno, along with Bill Rhinehart, was traded from the Washington Nationals to the Cincinnati Reds for Jonny Gomes. On May 26, 2014, Manno was released by the Cincinnati Reds.

On June 9, 2014, Manno signed a minor league contract with the Washington Nationals. In 12 games split between the High–A Potomac Nationals and Double–A Harrisburg Senators, he accumulated a 3.44 ERA with 24 strikeouts across 18 1/3 innings pitched. The Nationals organization released him on July 27.

== International career ==
Born in the United States, Manno is of Spanish descent through his grandparents. He played for the Spain national team in the 2013 World Baseball Classic.
