= Todd Incantalupo =

Italian baseball player (born 1976)

- Pitcher
- Born: 18 May 1976 (age 49); Stamford, Connecticut, U.S.
- Bats: Left Throws: Left

Todd Vincent Incantalupo (born 18 May 1976) is an American former professional baseball player who played internationally for the Italy national baseball team.

== Biography ==
Incantalupo played college baseball at Providence College. In 1996, he played collegiate summer baseball with the Harwich Mariners of the Cape Cod Baseball League. After three years at PC, he was drafted in the eighth round (247th overall) of the 1997 MLB draft by the Milwaukee Brewers. Incantalupo spent three years in the minor league system, then made the move to Italian Baseball League club Fortitudo Baseball Bologna in 2000. Due to his Italian heritage, he was selected to play for the Italian national team at the 2006 World Baseball Classic.
