= Max Burt (baseball) =

American baseball player (born 1996)

Free agent
- Shortstop
- Born: August 28, 1996 (age 30); North Andover, Massachusetts, U.S.
- Bats: Right Throws: Right

Maxwell Joseph Burt (born August 28, 1996) is an American professional baseball infielder who is a free agent. He played college baseball at Northeastern University in Boston and played high school baseball at St. Johns Preparatory School in Danvers, Massachusetts.

Burt stands at 6'1" and weighs 200 pounds (91 kg). He bats and throws right-handed.

== Amateur career ==
=== St. Johns Preparatory School ===
Burt played High School Baseball at St. Johns Preparatory School in Danvers, Massachusetts, where he was the captain of the baseball team as well as playing basketball all four years at St. Johns and golf for two years. He had a .330 career batting average at St. Johns while leading them to win the league championship in 2013 and 2014 as well as earning multiple awards at St. Johns.

=== Northeastern University ===
He then played college ball for the Northeastern Huskies from 2015 to 2018, batting .260/.333/.367 with 214 hits, 12 home runs, 109 RBI and 33 stolen bases in 224 games. In 2017, he played collegiate summer baseball with the Harwich Mariners of the Cape Cod Baseball League.

== Professional career ==
=== New York Yankees ===
Burt was drafted by the New York Yankees in the 28th round of the 2018 Major League Baseball draft, 847th overall. He made his professional debut with the rookie-level Pulaski Yankees, where he slashed .274/.347/.366 with 51 hits, 21 RBI, and five stolen bases in 51 games.

Burt played in three different levels of the minor leagues in 2019, progressing from the Single-A Charleston RiverDogs to the High-A Tampa Tarpons, and finally to the Double-A Trenton Thunder. In 106 appearances split between the three affiliates, Burt hit .222/.272/.313 with eight home runs, 38 RBI, and five stolen bases. He did not play in a game in 2020 due to the cancellation of the minor league season because of the COVID-19 pandemic. Burt returned to action in 2021 with Tampa, the Double-A Somerset Patriots and Triple-A Scranton/Wilkes-Barre RailRiders. In 91 appearances split between the three affiliates, he slashed .237/.303/.373 with seven home runs, 35 RBI, and six stolen bases.

Burt spent the entire 2022 season with Double-A Somerset, hitting .205/.269/.373 with 11 home runs, 32 RBI, and 19 stolen bases over 85 games. He started off his 2023 campaign strong back with Somerset, going 11-for-21 (.524) with three home runs, and an Eastern League-leading 12 RBI and 1.625 OPS in the first seven games of the season. Burt credited an adjusted mentality while batting as a key component to his early success, saying "It's all mental for me. I knew I had all the physical attributes and stuff like that, but for me I needed to take a step up mentally and I knew that was my next step to kind of take me to that next level. I'm still working on it every day. You're only as good as your next at-bat." Burt attributed this change in mindset to Somerset's hitting coach, Jake Hirst, saying he helped him "dumb everything down" while in the batter's box, so he's not flooded with thoughts as the pitch is coming in. He reflected on his struggles at the plate in 2022, saying "Last year [2022] was too much life and death with every at-bat, where this year, I'm thinking more about the whole process. This season, every pitch is its own pitch, every pitch is its own entity. The at-bat I have in April is hopefully going to be the at-bat I have in October, so I'm viewing every pitch the exact same this year." His good play earned him a promotion to Triple-A Scranton on June 22, 2023. He played in only seven games for the RailRiders, where he went 2-for-16 (.125) with no home runs and one RBI before being sent back down to the Patriots. In 98 total appearances for both affiliates, Burt slashed an aggregate .235/.319/.393 with career-highs in home runs (12), RBI (44), stolen bases (21).

Burt split the 2024 campaign between the rookie-level Florida Complex League Yankees, Tampa, and Scranton, batting a cumulative .147/.218/.246 with five home runs, 22 RBI, and 16 stolen bases across 78 total appearances. He elected free agency following the season on November 4, 2024.

On March 18, 2025, Burt re-signed with the Yankees organization on a minor league contract. He made 68 appearances for Somerset and Scranton, hitting a combined .223/.296/.297 with 23 RBI and 11 stolen bases. Burt elected free agency following the season on November 6.

=== Detroit Tigers ===
On February 24, 2026, Burt signed a minor league contract with the Detroit Tigers organization. In 110 games between Triple-A and Double-A he batted .220/.304/.347 with 8 home runs, 47 RBIs and 28 stolen bases. He elected free agency on November 2.
