= Harwich Mariners =

Collegiate summer baseball team in Massachusetts

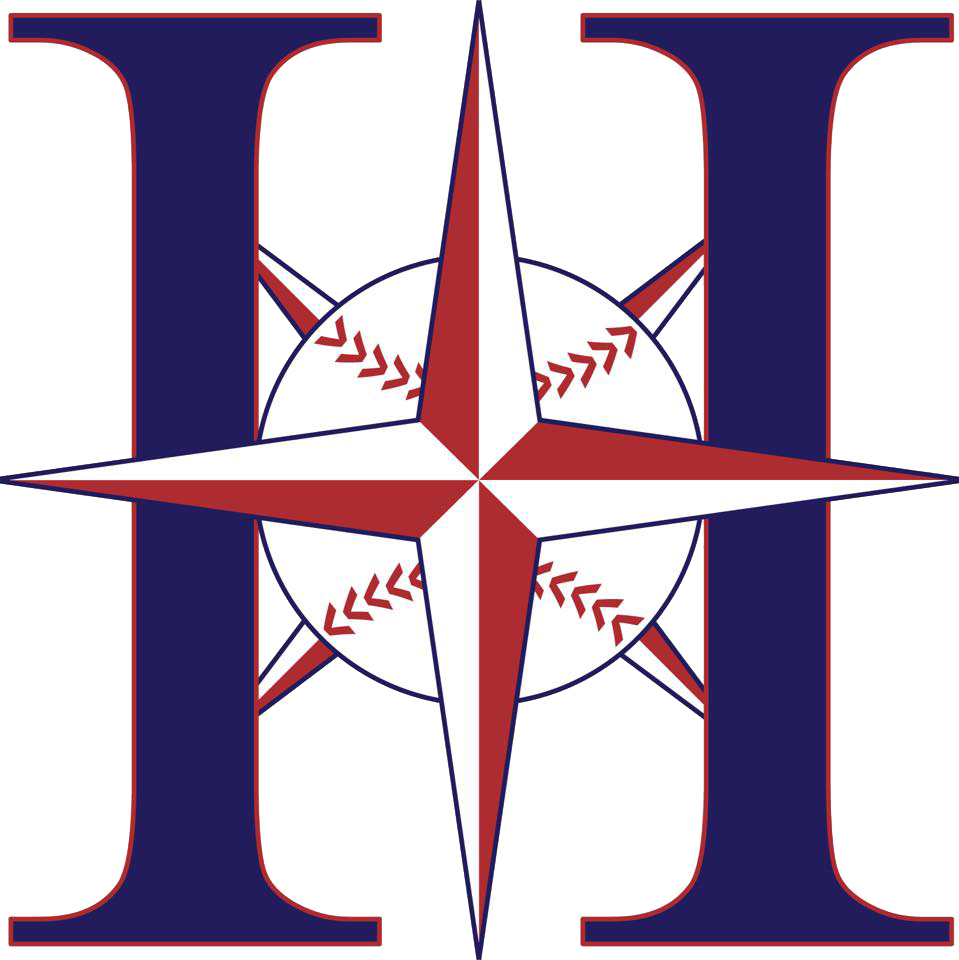
- Logo

Information
- League: Cape Cod Baseball League (East Division)
- Location: Harwich, Massachusetts
- Ballpark: Whitehouse Field at Monomoy Regional High School
- League championships: 1933, 1983, 1987, 2008, 2011, 2024, 2026
- Colors: Red, White and Navy
- President: Mary Henderson
- General manager: Kevin Boggan / Alex Lumb
- Manager: Steve Englert
- Website: www.capecodleague.com/harwich/

The Harwich Mariners are a collegiate summer baseball team based in Harwich, Massachusetts. The team is a member of the Cape Cod Baseball League (CCBL) and plays in the league's East Division. The Mariners play their home games at Whitehouse Field in the historic village of Harwich Center.

Harwich has won four CCBL championships in the 21st century, most recently in 2026 by defeating the Bourne Braves two games to one to win the best of three championship series. The title was the team's sixth in the CCBL's modern era and seventh overall. Since the club's inception, over 100 players have gone on to play in Major League Baseball.

== History ==
=== Pre-modern era ===
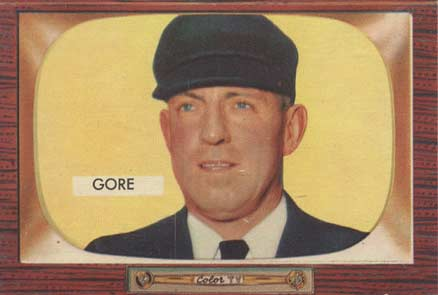
Artie Gore was a flashy infielder for Chatham-Harwich from 1927 to 1929, and went on to a ten-year umpiring career in the National League.

==== Early years ====
Organized baseball in the town of Harwich dates to the late 1800s. As early as 1873, the "Independent Base Ball Club" had been organized and was playing at the "Brooks Estate" in Harwich. The Harwich town club took on Sandwich in an 1884 contest, and played the "Yarmouth Grays" on multiple occasions in 1886. In 1903, the town's "Old Home Week" featured a three-game baseball series in which the Harwich team defeated Sandwich twice and Hyannis once. The home club was described as "the best that ever represented Harwich," and featured several collegiate players, as well as local hurler Dick Gage, who in 1905 was described as "by far the best pitcher on the Cape."

==== The early Cape League era (1923–1939) ====
In 1923, the Cape Cod Baseball League was formed and initially included four teams: Falmouth, Chatham, Osterville, and Hyannis. This early Cape League operated through the 1939 season and disbanded in 1940, due in large part to the difficulty of securing ongoing funding during the Great Depression.

Harwich originally entered the Cape League as part of a combined Chatham-Harwich team that competed in the league from 1927 to 1929. The team's home games were split between the two town fields. In the inaugural 1927 season, the team finished fourth in the five-team league, but nevertheless was described as "the hardest hitting team in the league." 1927 Chatham-Harwich first baseman Jack Burns went on to play in seven major league seasons for the St. Louis Browns and Detroit Tigers. In all three seasons from 1927 to 1929, the team featured Boston College batterymates pitcher Pete Herman and catcher George Colbert, as well as flashy infielder Artie Gore. The trio of Herman, Colbert and Gore later teamed up again with Barnstable to bring that club multiple Cape League championships in the 1930s. Gore went on to a major league umpiring career, working ten years in the National League, including two World Series assignments.

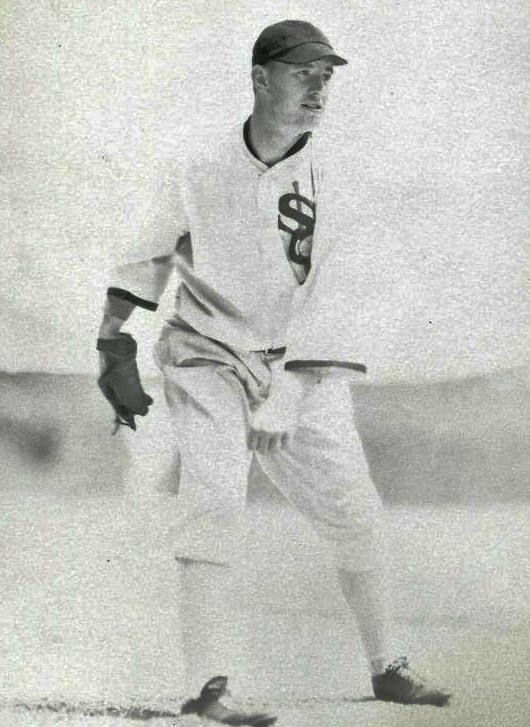
Bill Chamberlain was one of the first Harwich players to go on to the major leagues.

In 1930, the Chatham-Harwich team split and the two towns entered individual teams in the league, with Harwich playing its home games at Brooks Park. Throughout the 1930s as other teams struggled to stay in the league, Harwich was consistently among the best funded and best supported teams in the Cape League.

One of the first Harwich players to go on to the major leagues was Milton, Massachusetts native Bill Chamberlain. In 1932, Chamberlain was pitching for Harwich when he was noticed by a scout for the Chicago White Sox. Chamberlain was playing in Chicago by the end of the season.

In 1933, Harwich won its first Cape League championship. The team starred all-league selection Frank Skaff of Villanova, an outfielder who "covers acres of territory, catches everything in sight," and was "the dread of all opposing pitchers", and who went on to play for the Brooklyn Dodgers two years later. The Cape League split its regular season in 1933, and held a playoff for the league title between the winners of the first and second halves of the season. Harwich, winners of the season's second half, faced first-half winners and back-to-back defending league champion Falmouth. Harwich took the first game of the best-of-five championship series with a 4–2 home win, then went on the road and dished out a 10–1 pummelling at Falmouth Heights. The series returned to Harwich for Game 3, where the home team sent ace hurler Al Blanche to the mound. Blanche, a Somerville, Massachusetts native who went on to play with the major league Boston Braves, outdueled Falmouth's Harold Poole, 3–1, to complete the three-game sweep and secure the title for Harwich.

In 1937 and 1938, Harwich was led by player-manager Neil Mahoney, an all-Cape League selection at catcher who went on to be scouting director of the Boston Red Sox. Mahoney's 1937 Harwich team featured Holy Cross pitcher Art Kenney and former Chicago White Sox outfielder Bill Barrett. Barrett had played several productive seasons in the major leagues, and finished tops in the Cape League in 1937 with a .440 batting average, as his "potent bat of bygone glory still [carried] a mean threat." Kenney played in the following season for the major league Boston Bees (Braves). Mahoney's 1938 team narrowly missed bringing Harwich its second league title, finishing the season just one game behind pennant-winning Falmouth.

==== The Upper and Lower Cape League era (1946–1962) ====
After a hiatus during the years of World War II, the Cape League was reconstituted in 1946, with Harwich joining the Lower Cape Division. In the inaugural season of the revived league, Harwich defeated Barnstable in the playoffs for the Lower Cape title, but was shut down by Upper Cape champ Falmouth in the league championship series. The 1946 season also featured the league's first All-Star Game, held at Harwich's Brooks Park. The contest matched a team of CCBL all-stars against a team of Boston Red Sox tryout players chosen by scouts of the major league team.

In the 1949 and 1950 seasons, Harwich fielded two entries in the Cape League, as the Cape Verdean Club of Harwich joined the league's Lower Cape Division.

Harwich did not reach the league title series again until 1962 when the team was downed by Upper Cape powerhouse Cotuit after defeating Chatham for the Lower Cape title. Harwich's 1961 and 1962 teams featured CCBL Hall of Famer and longtime New Jersey Devils general manager Lou Lamoriello, who played in the CCBL until 1964, then skippered Sagamore to the league title in 1965.

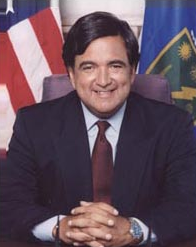
Former New Mexico Governor and US Ambassador to the United Nations Bill Richardson pitched for Harwich in 1968.

=== Modern era (1963–present) ===
In 1963, the CCBL was reorganized and became officially sanctioned by the NCAA. The league would no longer be characterized by "town teams" who fielded mainly Cape Cod residents, but would now be a formal collegiate league. Teams began to recruit college players and coaches from an increasingly wide geographic radius.

The league was originally composed of ten teams, which were divided into Upper Cape and Lower Cape divisions. Harwich joined Orleans, Chatham, Yarmouth and a team from Otis Air Force Base in the Lower Cape Division.

==== The 1960s and 1970s ====
The Harwich teams of the mid- and late-1960s featured several notable players. Harwich's native son and Boston College hurler Peter Ford spent four summers with the team, posting a combined ERA of 3.36 with 18 wins and two league all-star selections. Ford later served as a Cape League vice president, and was inducted into the CCBL Hall of Fame in 2010.

Harwich's 1966 team featured CCBL Hall of Famer Ed Drucker, who batted .382, set a league record with eight triples, and was named league MVP. The 1967 Harwich team featured Northbridge, Massachusetts native and future major leaguer Glenn Adams, a center fielder who slugged three triples in a single game for the Mariners, and blasted a homer in the CCBL All-Star Game at Eldredge Park.

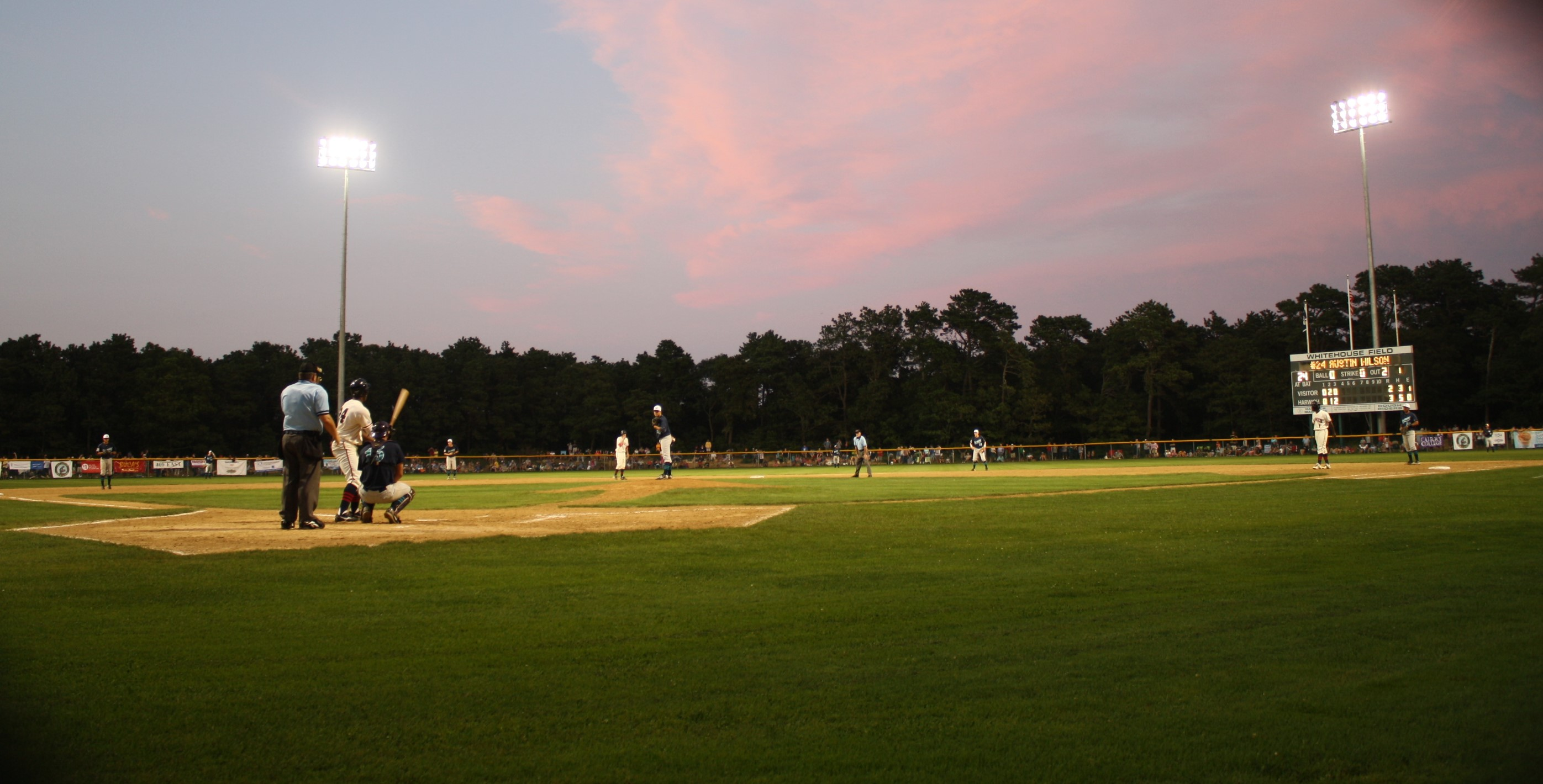
Whitehouse Field, home of the Mariners since 1969.

In 1968, CCBL Hall of Fame manager John Carroll took the reins and led the Mariners to a 26–13 record, winning the Lower Cape Division in the team's final season at Brooks Park. The team included pitcher Bill Richardson, who went on to become the Governor of New Mexico and the United States Ambassador to the United Nations. In the 1968 title series, Harwich faced Upper Cape champ Falmouth, who prevailed three games to one in what was the first of Falmouth's four consecutive titles from 1968 to 1971. The following year the Mariners moved to their new home at Whitehouse Field. The CCBL held its 1969 All-Star Game at the new ballpark, the Lower Cape emerging with a 4–0 victory.

CCBL Hall of Famer Fred Ebbett took over the Mariners' managerial post in 1971 after over 20 highly successful seasons coaching baseball at Harwich High School. Ebbett skippered the team in 1971 and 1972, then again from 1975 to 1977. He went on to serve as CCBL Commissioner from 1984 to 1996, where he was a driving force behind the league's momentous transition to an all-wooden bat league in the mid-1980s.

The Mariners qualified for the playoffs in 1974 behind CCBL Outstanding Pitcher Award winner Andy Muhlstock, but were bested in the semi-final round by Orleans. Piloted by first-year manager Don Prohovich, Harwich advanced to the CCBL title series in 1978 and followed up that appearance with a return to the finals in 1979. In both title series, the Mariners were defeated by a dominant Hyannis team that had rolled through the two regular seasons with records of 31–11 and 33–7–1.

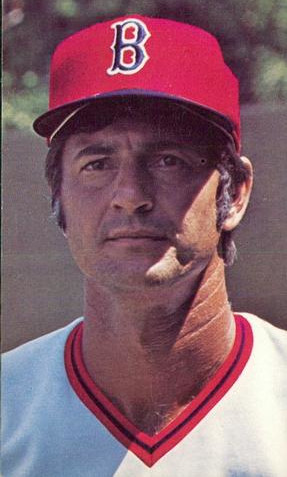
Baseball Hall of Famer Carl Yastrzemski was a fixture in the Harwich dugout during the 1981 MLB players strike.

==== The 1980s bring a pair of league titles ====
In both 1981 and 1982, the Mariners boasted the league's Outstanding Pitcher Award winner: Greg Myers in 1981, and Scott Murray in 1982. The 1981 team featured Florida State University's Mike Yastrzemski, son of Baseball Hall of Famer and Boston Red Sox legend Carl Yastrzemski. Nearing the end of his major league playing career, the elder Yaz found himself with time on his hands that summer due to the 1981 Major League Baseball strike. As a result, he spent much of June and July in the Harwich Mariners' dugout keeping an eye on his son's progress. The 1982 Mariners featured CCBL Hall of Fame slugger Pat Pacillo, who walloped 10 homers on the season.

In 1983, Harwich finally broke through and claimed a CCBL title. Skippered by Steve Ring, the team returned the powerful Pacillo, who was good again for eight homers and a .338 batting average, and even went 1–0 with a 4.82 ERA as a pitcher. Rob Souza went 7–2 on the mound in the regular season, and led the league with a 2.45 ERA. The star of the team however was the league's Outstanding Pro Prospect Award winner, Cory Snyder. The CCBL Hall of Famer clouted an amazing league record 22 home runs with 50 RBI and 47 runs scored. He hit home runs in four consecutive at bats on July 7–8, and twice hit three home runs in a game. The Mariners finished the regular season in third place, but eliminated Hyannis two games to one in the playoff semi-finals to earn a berth in the best-of-five title series against top-seeded Cotuit.

In Game 1 of the 1983 championship series, the Mariners came out on the wrong end of a 1–0 pitchers' duel, won on an RBI single by Kettleer Will Clark. Games 2 and 3 were played as a doubleheader. In the front end of the twinbill, Harwich jumped all over the Kettleers with a seven-run second, including a grand slam by Jon Pequignot. Souza went the distance in a 16–6 Mariner rout at Lowell Park. The back end of the doubleheader was played at Whitehouse Field, where Harwich hurler Jeff Koenigsman stymied the Cotuit attack. The Mariners took it, 7–3, to go up two games to one. Games 4 and 5 were played the following day as another doubleheader. With their backs against the wall and trailing through much of Game 4 at home, the Kettleers staged a late-inning comeback to knot the series with an 8–7 win. The Game 5 finale at Harwich was an all-time classic. Cotuit got a three-run homer in the top of the first, and Harwich answered in the bottom of the frame with a Pacillo grand slam. Harwich starter Mike Ulian was hit hard for seven runs, and Souza, who had pitched a complete game the day before, came on and was effective in long relief. Mariner Doug Shields cranked a three-run homer in the seventh, and the score was tied at 7–7 going to the final frame. Cotuit's Greg Barrios launched a two-run dinger in the top of the ninth to put the Kettleers up, 9–7, and hope was waning for the Whitehouse faithful. The Mariners came down to their final out with nobody on in the bottom half of the inning, but Pacillo doubled, and Pequignot came through with a clutch homer to send the game to extra innings. Both teams threatened but did not score in the 10th. Robbie Smith came on in relief of Souza in the 11th and set down Cotuit in order. In the bottom of the 11th, Harwich's Jim Sasko drove in Pequignot from third for the series-winning RBI and Harwich's first Cape League championship in the modern era.

The 1984 Mariners finished the regular season atop the league with an impressive 27–15 record, due in large part to the contributions of four CCBL Hall of Famers. League Outstanding Pro Prospect Award winner Mike Loggins batted .343 with 13 homers and was MVP of the CCBL All-Star Game at Philadelphia's Veterans Stadium. Joe Magrane led the league with six wins and six complete games, posted a 2.46 ERA with 77 strikeouts in 80.1 innings, and pitched two shutout innings and was the winning pitcher in the CCBL All-Star Game. Fellow all-star pitcher Scott Kamieniecki went 4–1 for the Mariners with a 2.14 ERA and 54 strikeouts. Casey Close was a dual threat, batting .329 with six home runs while going 2–0 with a 3.19 ERA on the mound. Close returned to Harwich in 1985 and again enjoyed an all-star campaign with 11 home runs and 30 RBI. CCBL Hall of Famer Scott Hemond was league MVP for Harwich in 1986; the outfielder/catcher slugged six home runs and led the league with a .358 batting average.

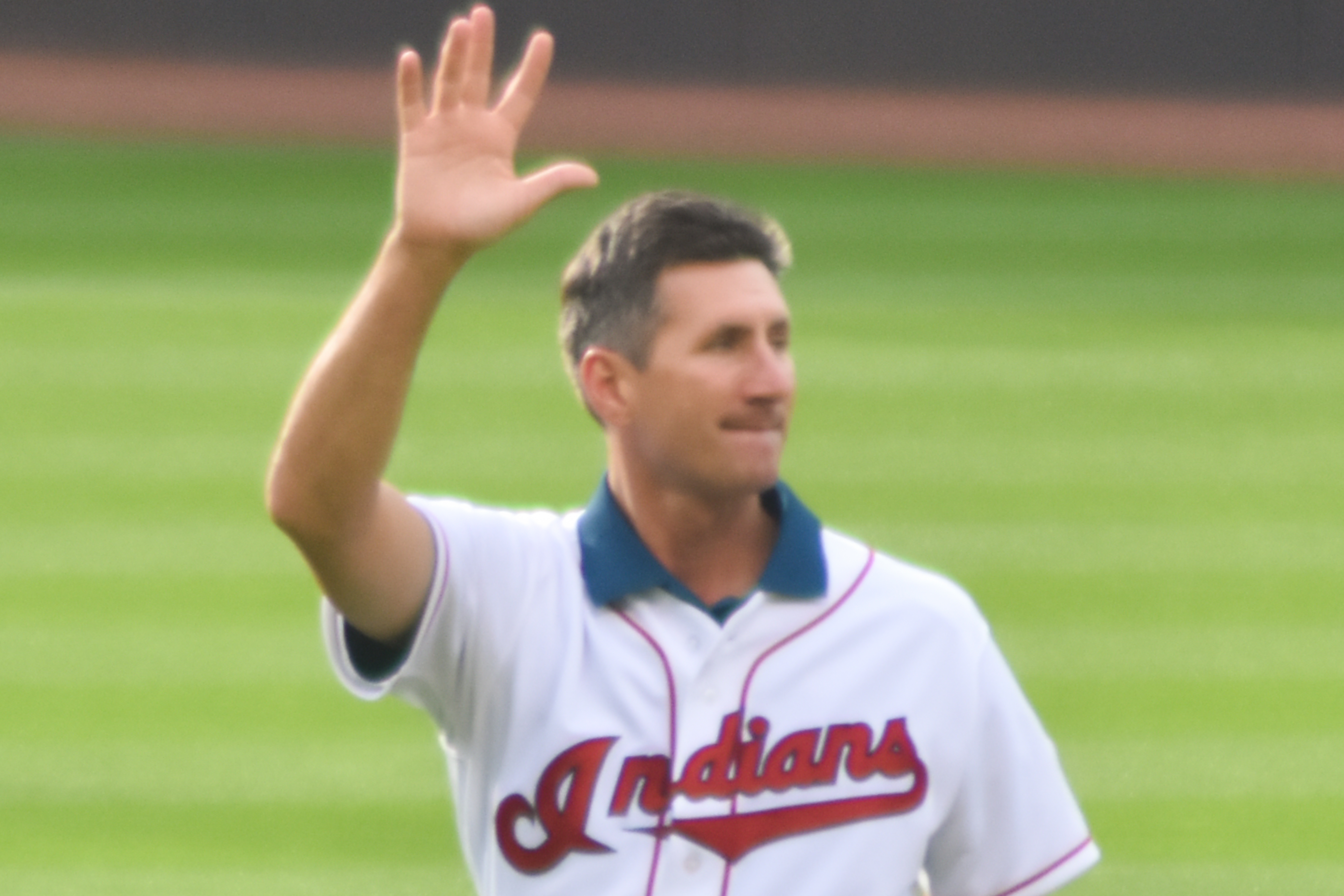
Charles Nagy was playoff MVP of Harwich's 1987 championship season.

Harwich wore the league crown again in 1987 for the second time in five years. On the mound, team MVP Dan Kite posted six wins and four complete games with a 2.21 ERA, and future major league all-star Charles Nagy of the University of Connecticut and Andy Berg were CCBL all-stars in the Mariners' bullpen. The team also featured future major leaguers John Flaherty, University of Massachusetts infielder Gary Disarcina, and slugger Bob Hamelin, who led the league with 11 home runs. Led by manager Bill Springman, the Mariners finished the regular season with the league's best record, and met Cotuit in the playoff semi-finals. In Game 1, Harwich struck early at home with a three-run bomb by Steve Finken in a four-run first inning, and Kite went the distance on the hill, striking out 13 Kettleers en route to a 4–2 win. Finken hit a two-run dinger in Game 2 at Lowell Park, and teammate Tom Boyce added a pair of homers, but it wasn't enough as Cotuit prevailed, 9–8 in 10 innings. Cotuit's Troy Chacon allowed only two Mariners hits in Game 3 at Whitehouse Field, but one of them was a second-inning solo shot by Boyce. Harwich starter Nelson Arriete made the lone run stand up, going the distance in the 1–0 shutout to advance the Mariners to the title series against Y-D.

In Game 1 of the 1987 championship series at Whitehouse Field, the Red Sox chased Mariners starter Everett Cunningham from the mound in the fifth, and Nagy came on in relief trailing, 3–1. Boyce hit yet another clout in the seventh to narrow the margin, and Derek Lee proved the hero with a three-run go-ahead blast in the eighth. Nagy no-hit the Red Sox in 4 1/3 frames of relief, and the Mariners took the opener, 5–3. Kite went the distance for Harwich in Game 2 at Red Wilson Field, but scattered four runs and got little help from his bats in a 4–1 loss that knotted the series. Harwich got three runs in each of the first two innings of Game 3 on home turf, and Nagy came on in relief of starter Dave Menhart. For the second time in the series, Nagy no-hit the Red Sox over 4 1/3 innings of relief, and the Mariners came away with a 7–2 victory to secure the championship. Nagy, the playoff MVP, recorded the final out by way of strikeout against league MVP and batting champ Mickey Morandini, whom Nagy caught looking on a 3–2 count.

==== The 1990s ====
The Mariners qualified for postseason play only once in the 1990s, reaching the title series in 1997 under skipper Chad Holbrook, who had played in the Cape League in 1992 for Chatham. Holbrook's squad dropped the 1997 finals series to Wareham, a team that starred a familiar face: league MVP and CCBL Hall of Famer Carlos Peña, who had played for Harwich the previous season.

Notable players during the 1990s included Kevin Millar, a future Boston Red Sox fan favorite and member of the 2004 World Series team that ended the Red Sox' 86-year title drought. The Mariners also boasted the league's Outstanding Pitcher Award winner for three consecutive seasons with Eddie Yarnall (1995), Billy Coleman (1996) and Brent Hoard (1997).

In 1998, a new scoreboard was installed at Whitehouse Field, a donation of former Major League Baseball Commissioner Fay Vincent, Jr. in memory of his father, Fay Vincent, Sr. The Commissioner had been a longtime summer resident of Harwich and a fan of the Mariners and the CCBL, and wished to honor his late father who had been the baseball captain at Yale University in 1931. The scoreboard was dedicated on July 6, 1998 as part of "Fay Vincent Night at Whitehouse Field", and was billed by the CCBL as being "the largest scoreboard in New England south of Fenway Park." The 1998 Mariners were skippered by CCBL Hall of Famer Billy Best, who had played for Falmouth in 1979 where he set a CCBL record with his 32-game hitting streak.

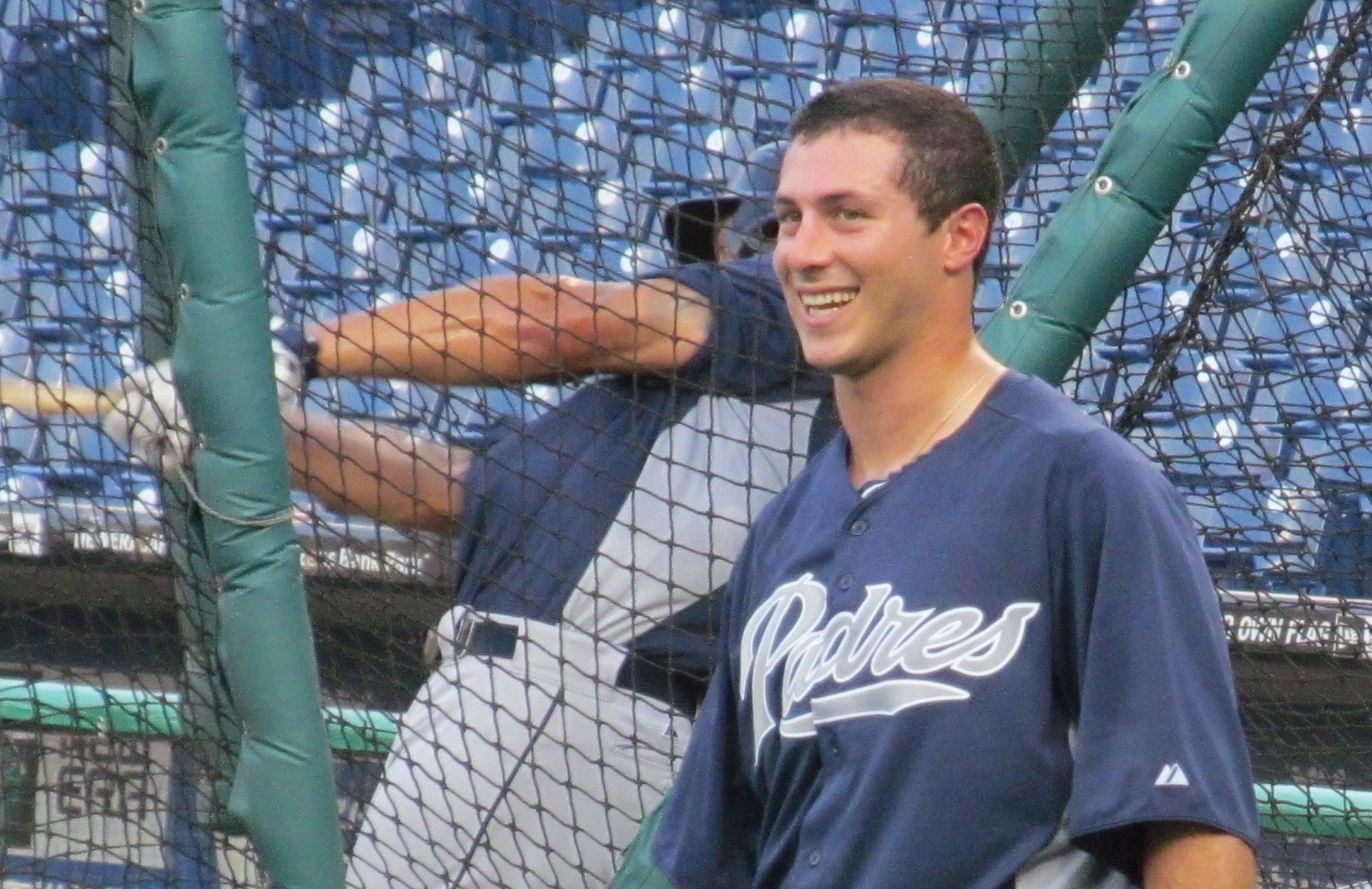
CCBL All-League catcher Tommy Medica hit .352 during Harwich's 2008 championship season.

==== The 2000s and the end of a long drought ====
The 2004 Mariners featured CCBL Hall of Famer Craig Hansen, a hard-throwing closer who recorded a perfect 0.00 ERA with 41 strikeouts in 22.1 innings of work. Other notable players during the decade included the 2002 CCBL Outstanding Relief Pitcher Award winner Shaun Marcum, and future major league all-star and Cy Young Award winner Tim Lincecum of the 2005 Mariners. The 2003 Mariners battled Orleans at Eldredge Park in a 20-inning marathon that set the record as the longest game in modern-era CCBL history. Harwich pushed across the go-ahead run in the top of the 20th, and second baseman Tug Hulett took the mound and recorded the save for the Mariners in the 5 hour, 52 minute affair. The Mariners' playoff drought continued well into the 2000s, as the team reached the postseason only once during the 20-year span from 1988 to 2007.

The Mariners' woes ended in 2008. The club featured future major league all-stars Brandon Belt and DJ LeMahieu, as well as one of the CCBL's top hitters, Tommy Medica, who batted .352 for the season. The Mariners opened the postseason with a two-game sweep of Orleans in the semi-finals, then faced Cotuit in the title series. After going on the road and pounding the Kettleers, 11–2, in Game 1, Harwich returned home for Game 2 with ideas of a sweep. Over 6,000 fans packed Whitehouse Field for the second game, but the series seemed headed back to Cotuit as the visitors took a 1–0 lead into the bottom of the ninth. A leadoff triple by Joe Sanders revived the Mariners' hopes, and with the bases loaded on a walk and hit batsman, skipper Steve Englert brought in pinch-hitter Mark Fleury. No stranger to late-inning heroics, Fleury had secured the East Division's 8–6 win in the CCBL All-Star Game with a two-run eighth-inning homer earlier in the season. Fleury rewarded Englert's confidence by coming through again, delivering Harwich's first league championship in 21 years with a 2-run walk-off poke to right-centerfield. For his clutch pinch-hit, Fleury was named playoff co-MVP with Jason Stidham, who had driven in seven runs for Harwich in Game 1 of the title series.

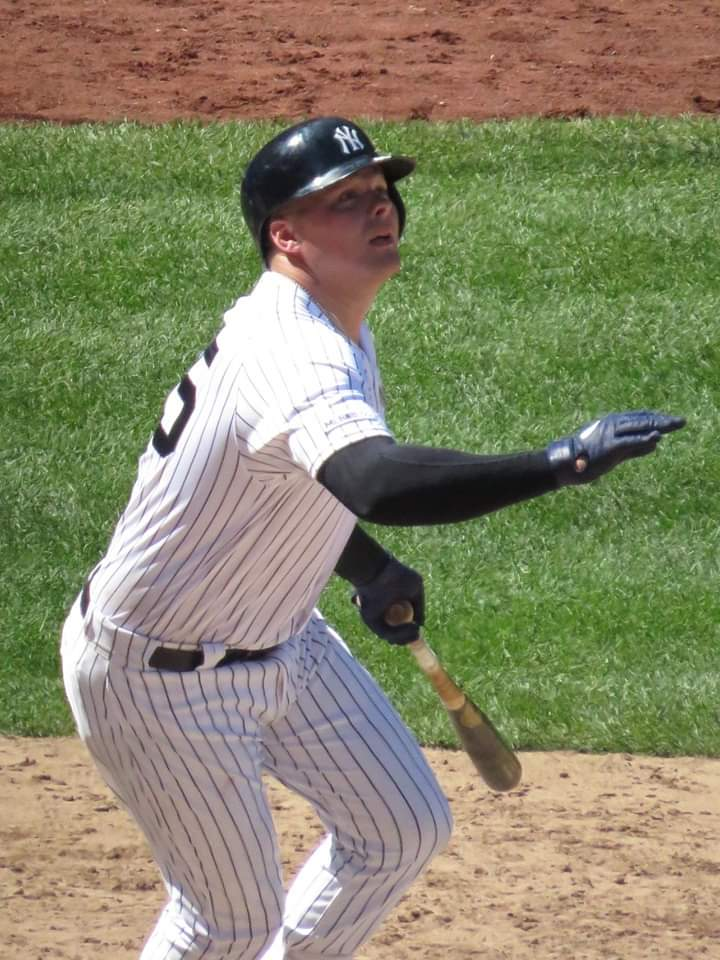
Luke Voit of the 2011 CCBL champion Mariners

==== The 2010s: Englert's boys win another one ====
Throughout the 2010s, Harwich continued to be piloted by Steve Englert, the longest-tenured manager in team history. The club reached the playoffs in eight of ten years in the decade, finishing first in the East Division three times.

Englert's 2011 squad was led by CCBL East Division All-Star Game starting pitcher Taylor Rogers, along with fellow all-stars Luke Voit at catcher, slugger Jabari Henry, and CCBL Hall of Fame reliever Chris Overman. As the playoffs began, the Mariners got a scare, with Brewster taking Game 1 of the first round series, but Harwich bounced back with an 8–2 Game 2 rout. The Mariners went down 2–0 early to the Whitecaps in Game 3, but scratched their way back behind 5 1/3 innings of scoreless relief by Eddie Butler, and Overman came on to get the final two outs to clinch the series with a 3–2 Harwich victory. In the East Division finals, the Mariners faced Y-D. After a Game 1 shutout of the Red Sox at home, Harwich sent Rogers to the mound with hopes of ending the series in Game 2 at Red Wilson Field. Rogers didn't disappoint, allowing only two Y-D hits through eight innings. Austin Nola homered for the Mariners, and Overman came in with runners on base in the ninth to close the door on the 4–2 Harwich victory to complete the series sweep.

In the 2011 title series, Harwich faced West Division champ Falmouth. The Mariners took Game 1 of the championship at home in a closely contested 5–4 game decided by first baseman John Wooten's go-ahead homer in the sixth. Wooten blasted another one in Game 2 at Falmouth, and the game went to the bottom of the ninth with Harwich leading, 7–5. With the title just three outs away, Englert brought in Overman to try to close out the Commodores in the final frame. Overman, who had not allowed an earned run in 28.1 innings during the season, proceeded to load the bases with no outs, but wiggled out of the jam by getting Falmouth's hot-hitting Reid Redman to pop out, then striking out the next batter, and finishing the job with a popout to the catcher to secure the Mariners' championship. Playoff MVP honors went to Mariner Mike Garza, who went 5-for-9 in the championship series.

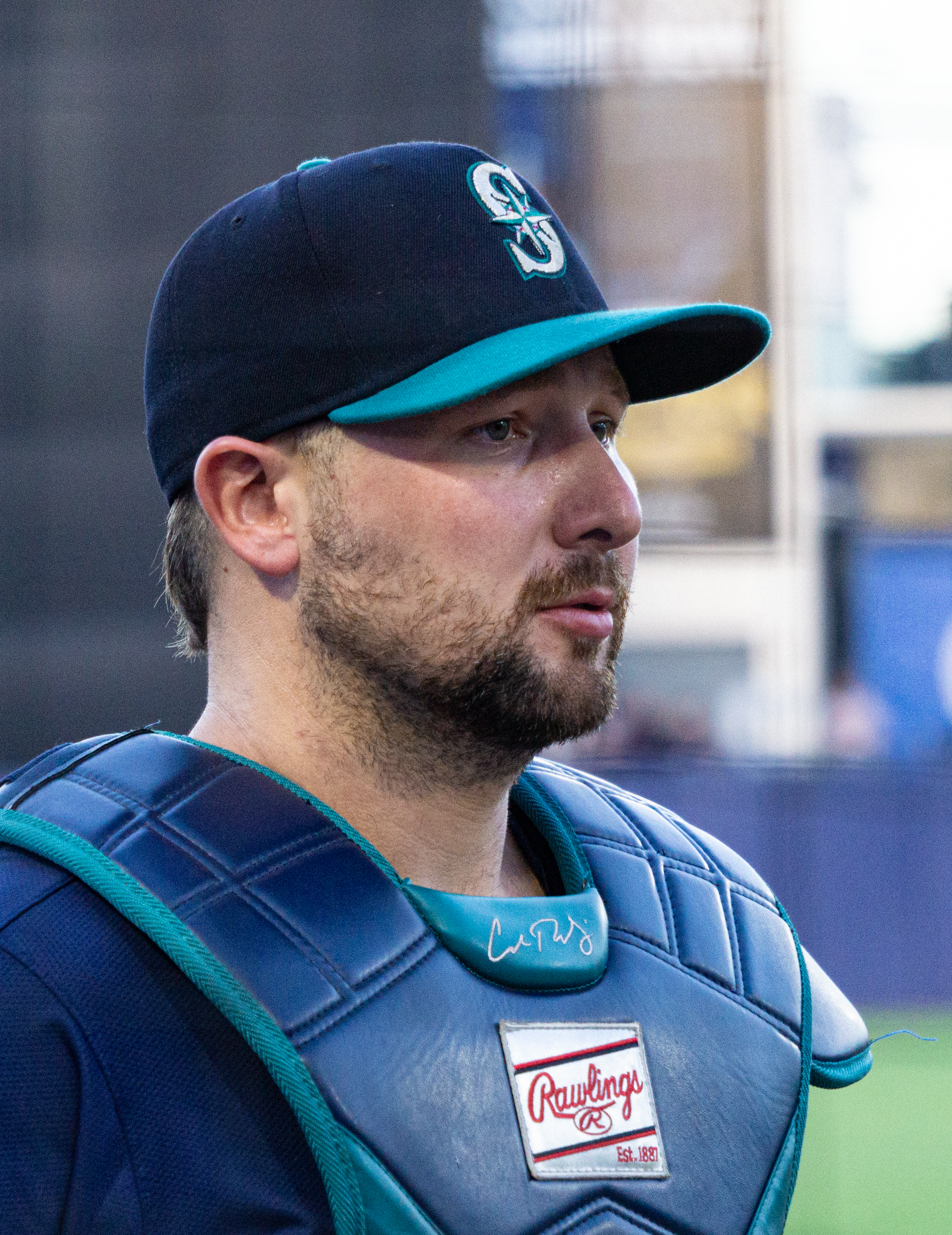
Cal Raleigh played for Harwich in 2016.

Notable players during the 2010s included 2012 league MVP Phil Ervin, who batted .323 with 11 homers for the Mariners, CCBL Hall of Famer Ian Happ, a two-time CCBL all-star in 2013 and 2014, and 2016 league MVP Ernie Clement, a second baseman who hit .353 on the season. Harwich boasted the league's home run derby champs in 2012 and 2014 as JaCoby Jones and Sal Annunziata claimed the honors. Massachusetts native and multi-sport athlete Pat Connaughton pitched briefly for Harwich in 2013, and went on to a career in the National Basketball Association. Another multi-sport athlete, Kyler Murray of the University of Oklahoma, played for Harwich in 2017 and went on to win the Heisman Trophy in 2018. In a season highlighted by a regular season no-hitter by Jake Palisch, and a playoff combined no-hitter against Chatham by hurlers Connor McCullough and Joe Boyle, the Mariners finished the 2019 regular season with only a .500 record, but cruised to the league championship series with playoff sweeps of Chatham and Y-D before being bounced in the finals by Cotuit.

==== The 2020s ====
The 2020 CCBL season was cancelled due to the coronavirus pandemic. The 2021 Mariners boasted the league's MVP as well as its Outstanding Pitcher as third baseman Brock Wilken and hurler Trey Dombroski took home the awards. In 2023, longtime league executive Mary Henderson marked her 40th year as President of the Harwich Athletic Association and was named to the CCBL Hall of Fame.

After a 2–17 start to the 2024 season, the Mariners caught fire heading into the playoffs and edged out Chatham in a one-game first round matchup. Trailing 5–4, league all-star Cam Maldonado led off the Harwich ninth with a triple, and RBIs by Aiden Robbins, Wilson Weber and Danny Dickinson put the Mariners up 7–5 for closer Kevin Zarnoch, who set down the Anglers in order in the final frame to secure the win. Facing Yarmouth–Dennis in the semifinal round, Harwich took Game 1 on the road, 10–2, behind the strong pitching of Justin Mitrovich and Jack Bowery, who pitched five and four innings respectively, allowing only two hits each. The Mariners sealed the series victory at home in Game 2, 5–1, as starter Donovan Burke tossed eight shutout innings, Macon Winslow drove in three on a 4th-inning double, and Zarnoch again was perfect to close out the ninth and send Harwich to the league championship series.

The 2024 CCBL Finals pitted Harwich against the two-time defending league champion Bourne Braves. The Mariners went on the road and took Game 1, 7–3, behind a five-run fifth inning and strong moundwork from Olin Johnson and Blake Morningstar. After dropping Game 2 at home, 7–1, Harwich bounced back at Doran Park in Game 3 with Maldonado providing the game-winning RBI double in the seventh, and Zarnoch once again tossing a perfect ninth to close the door on a 4–3 championship-clinching victory. Catcher Wilson Weber, a late-season pickup from Oregon State University, was named playoff MVP for his nine hits and six RBI in the postseason.

== CCBL Hall of Fame inductees ==
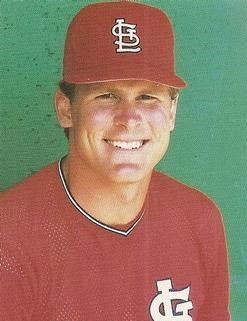
CCBL Hall of Famer Joe Magrane.

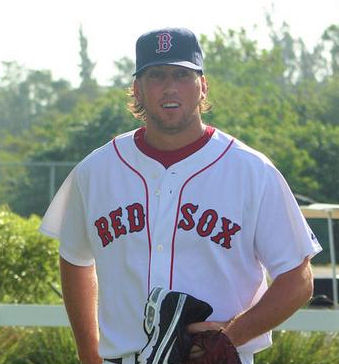
CCBL Hall of Famer Craig Hansen

The CCBL Hall of Fame and Museum is a history museum and hall of fame honoring past players, coaches, and others who have made outstanding contributions to the CCBL. Below are the inductees who spent all or part of their time in the Cape League with Harwich.

Year Inducted	Ref.	Name	Position
2001		Fred Ebbett	Manager
2003		Carlos Peña	Player
2003		Cory Snyder	Player
2005		Pat Pacillo	Player
2007		Scott Hemond	Player
2009		Lou Lamoriello	Player
2009		Joe Magrane	Player
2010		Peter Ford	Player / Executive
2010		Mike Loggins	Player
2010		Casey Close	Player
2011		Scott Kamieniecki	Player
2012		John Carroll	Manager
2012		Billy Best	Manager
2013		Ed Drucker	Player
2018		Craig Hansen	Player
2019		Chris Overman	Player
2022		Ian Happ	Player
2023		Mary Henderson	Executive

== Notable alumni ==
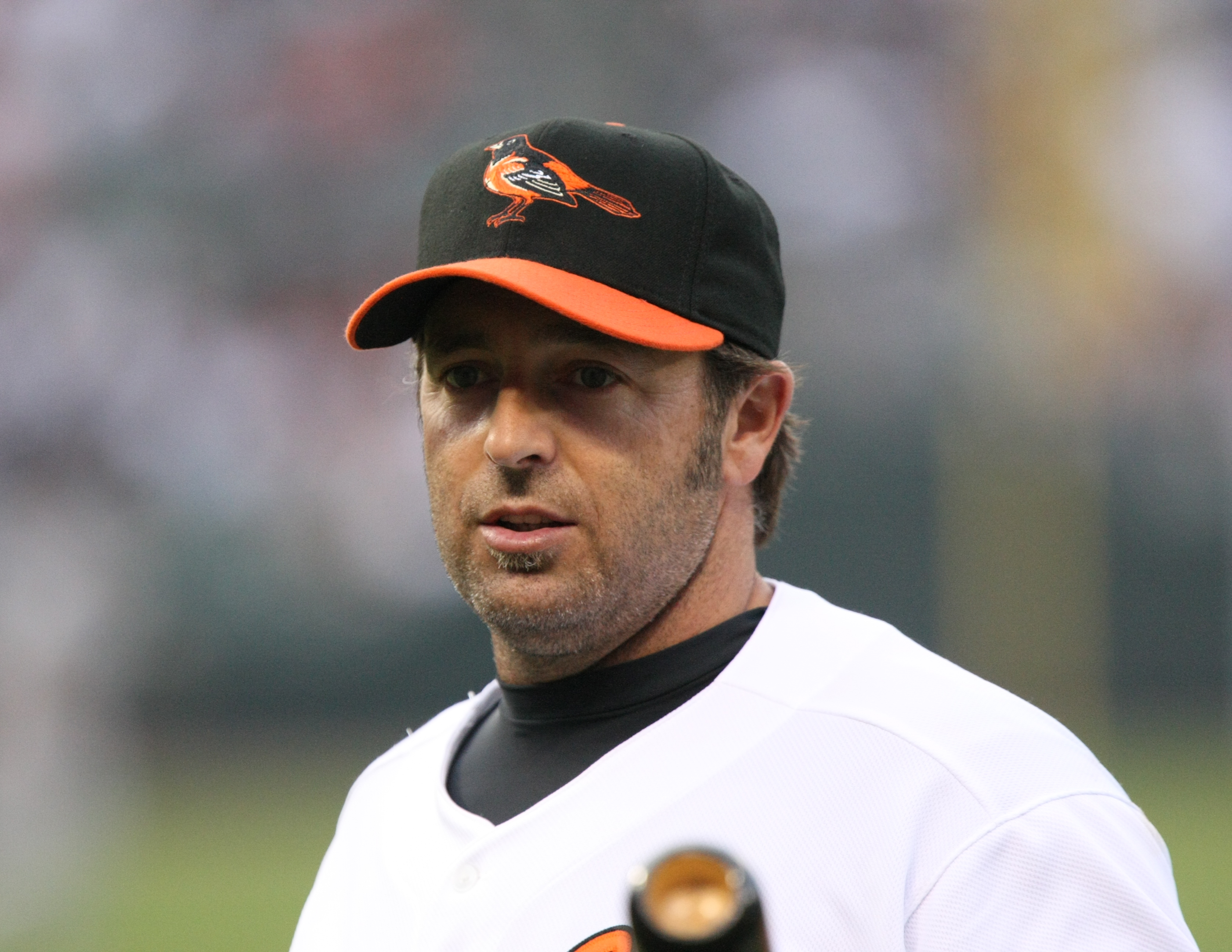
Kevin Millar

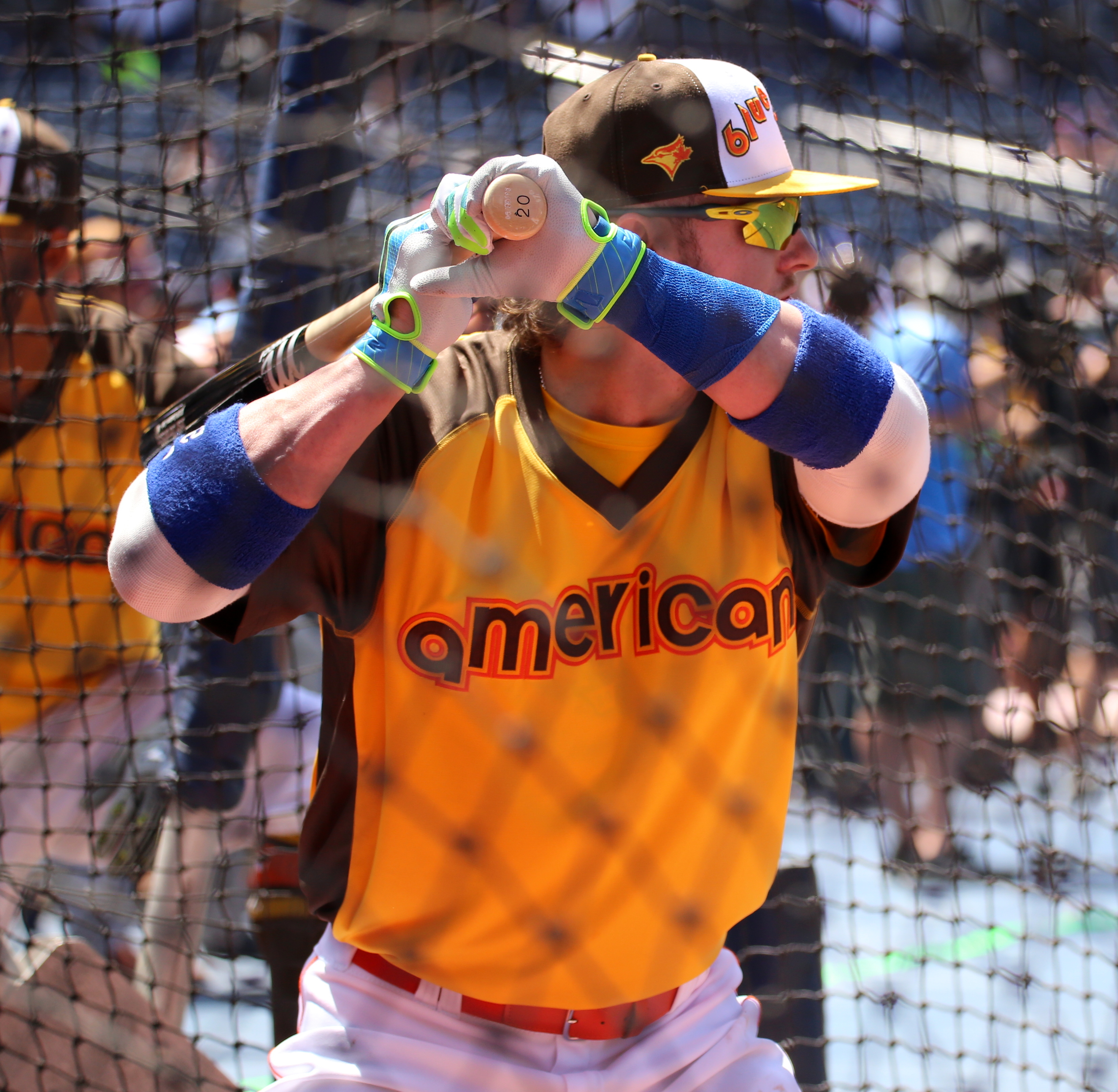
Josh Donaldson

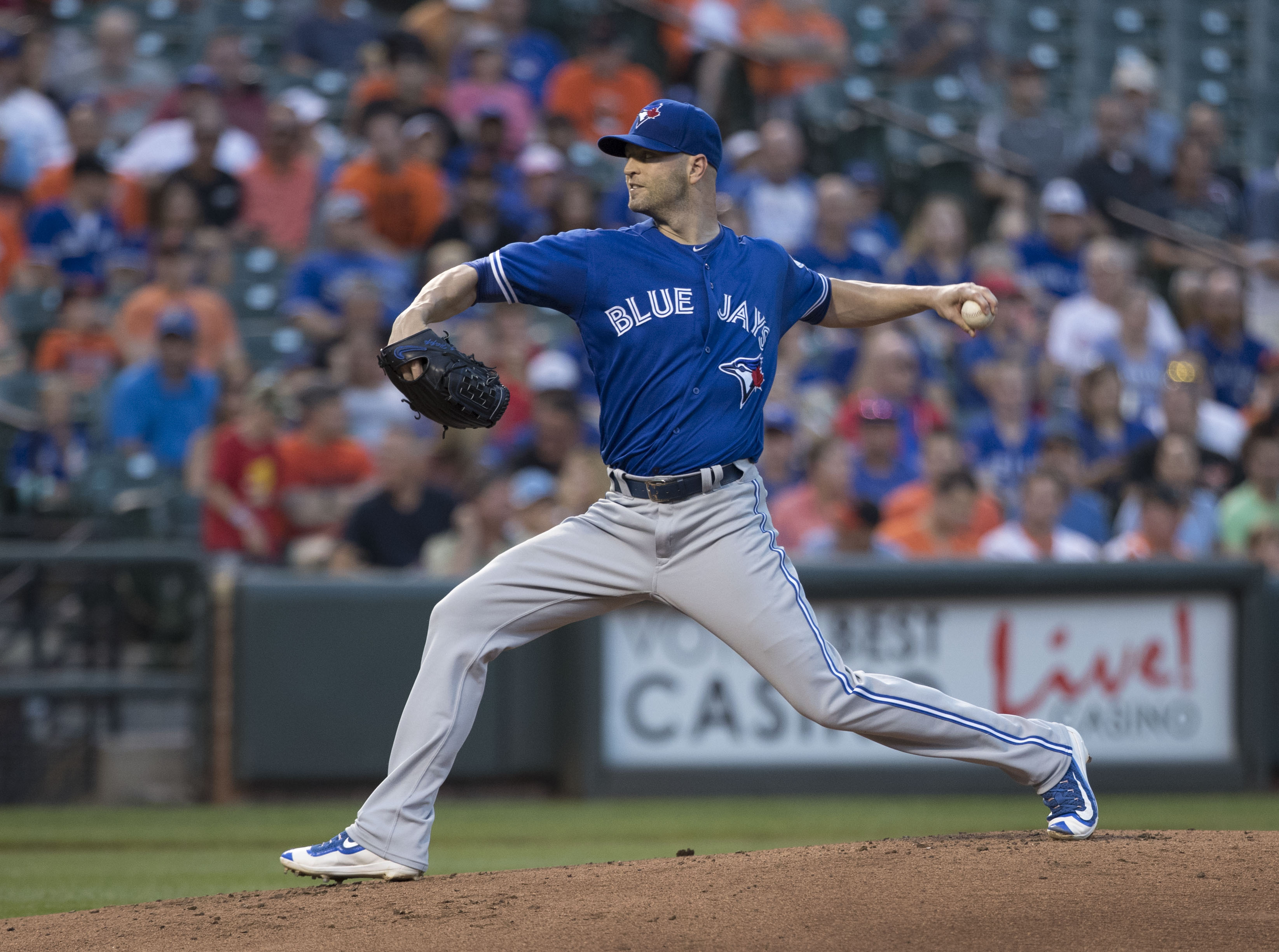
J. A. Happ

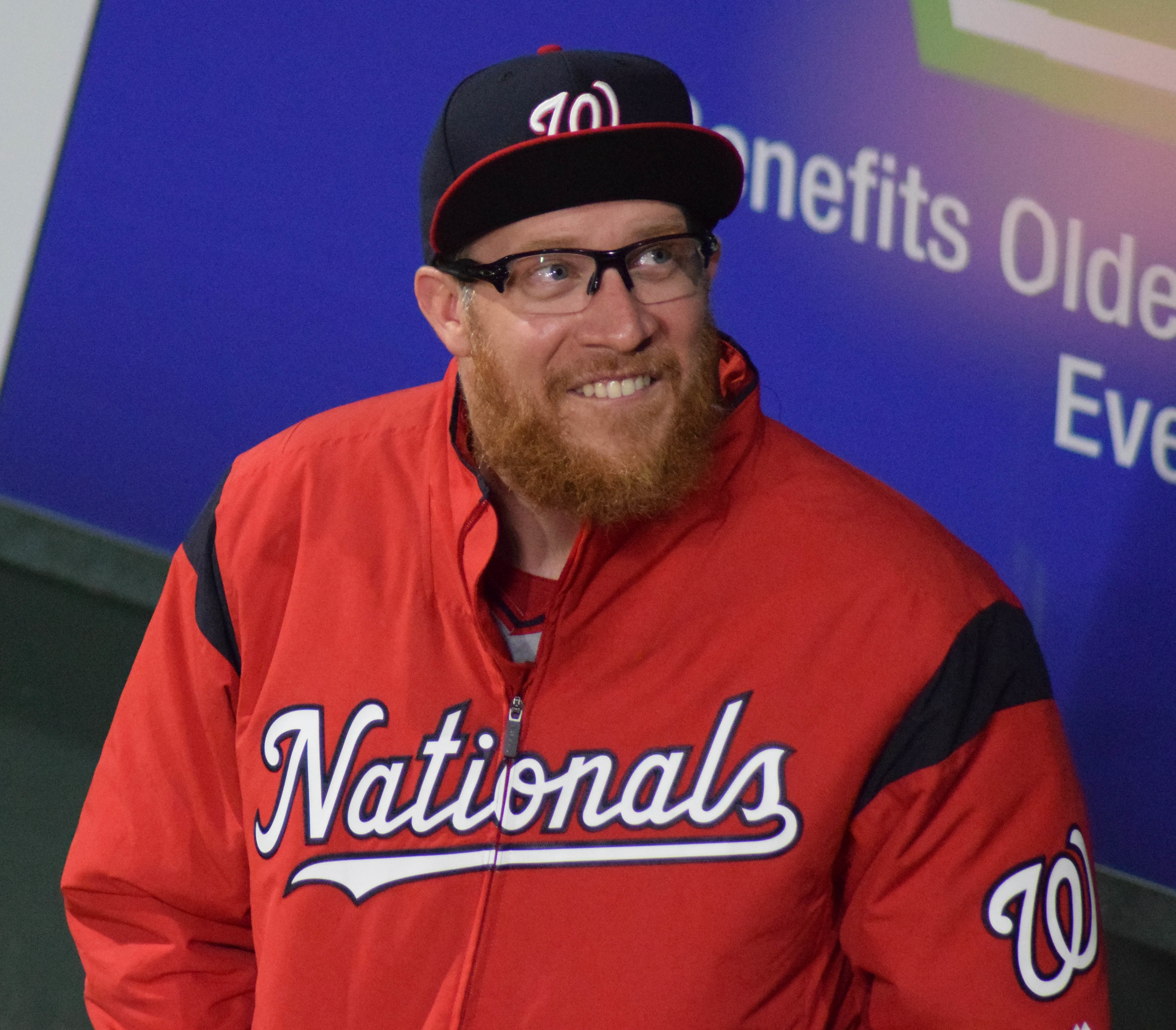
Sean Doolittle

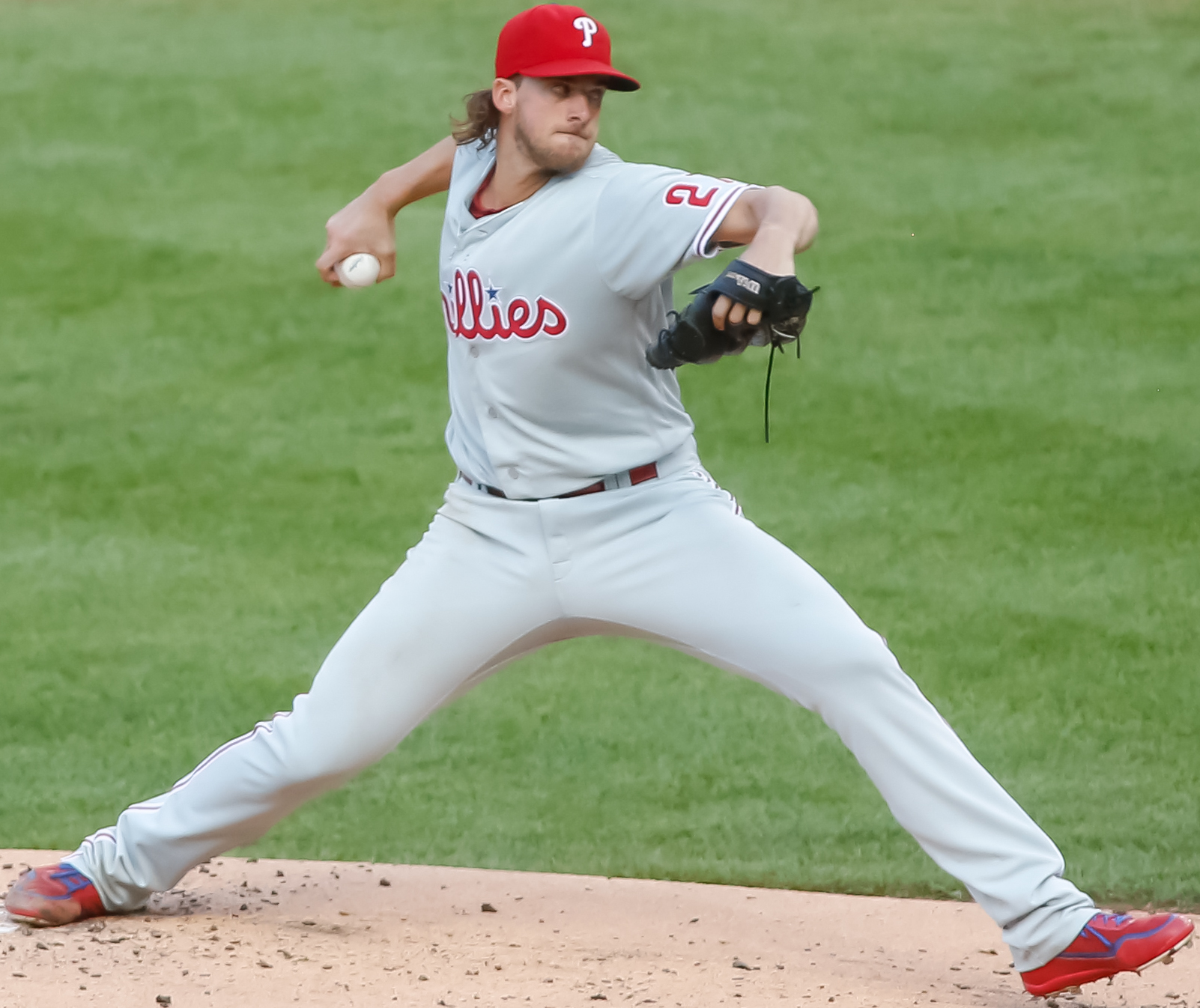
Aaron Nola

- Dustin Ackley 2008
- Glenn Adams 1967
- Andy Allanson 1982
- Logan Allen 2019
- Arshwin Asjes 2006
- Alex Avila 2007
- Mike Barlow 1969
- Scott Barnes 2007
- Bill Barrett 1937
- Joey Bart 2017
- Jason Bartlett 2000
- Jim Beattie 1974
- Jordan Beck 2021
- Eric Becker 2025
- Jalen Beeks 2013
- Tyler Bell 2025
- Brandon Belt 2008
- Cavan Biggio 2014–2015
- Al Blanche 1933–1934
- Skye Bolt 2014
- Joe Boyle 2019
- Dewon Brazelton 1999
- Dana Brown 1987
- Tod Brown 1993
- Mark Budzinski 1994
- Aaron Bummer 2013
- Danny Burawa 2010
- Billy Burns 2011
- Jack Burns 1927
- Max Burt 2017
- Eddie Butler 2011
- Daniel Cabrera 2019
- Carter Capps 2011
- Stephen Cardullo 2009
- Keefe Cato 1978
- John Cerutti 1980
- Bill Chamberlain 1932
- Ernie Clement 2016
- Casey Close 1984–1985
- Pat Connaughton 2013
- Doug Corbett 1972
- Jake Cousins 2015
- Darron Cox 1987
- Evan Crawford 2007
- Kaelen Culpepper 2023
- Xzavion Curry 2018
- Gerry Davis 1978
- Tony DeFrancesco 1982–1983
- Evan Dempsey 2025
- Gary DiSarcina 1987
- Trey Dombroski 2021
- Chris Dominguez 2007
- Josh Donaldson 2006
- Sean Doolittle 2005
- Jack Dreyer 2018
- Logan Driscoll 2018
- Jason Dubois 1999
- Taylor Dugas 2010
- Joe Dunand 2016
- Brad Eldred 2000
- Phillip Ervin 2012
- Danny Farquhar 2007
- Cole Figueroa 2007
- Derek Fisher 2013
- John Flaherty 1987
- Caleb Freeman 2018
- Matt Frisbee 2017
- Eric Fryer 2006
- Herb Gallagher 1938
- Jeff Gardner 1984
- John Gast 2009
- Kevin Gausman 2011
- Dave Gavitt
- Jake Gelof 2022
- Jody Gerut 1996–1997
- Johnny Giavotella 2006–2007
- Mike Gillette 1987
- Henry Godbout 2024
- Jake Goebbert 2009
- Brian Goodwin 2010
- Artie Gore 1927–1929
- Reid Gorecki 2000
- Matt Gorski 2018
- Phil Gosselin 2009
- Oz Griebel 1970
- Gino Groover 2022
- Mark Guthrie 1986
- Brandon Guyer 2006
- Dave Haas 1986
- Bob Hamelin 1987
- Todd Haney 1985
- Craig Hansen 2004
- Ian Happ 2013–2014
- J. A. Happ 2003
- Jon Harris 2014
- Trey Harris 2016
- Scott Hemond 1986
- Randy Hennis 1986
- Tim Herrin 2017
- John Hicks 2010
- C.J. Hinojosa 2013–2014
- Tommy Hinzo 1984
- Rick Hirtensteiner 1988
- J. J. Hoover 2008
- Adam Housley 1992–1993
- Nick Howard 2013
- Sam Howard 2013
- Daniel Hudson 2007
- Tug Hulett 2003
- Jacob Hurtubise 2019
- Todd Incantalupo 1996
- Jonathan India 2016–2017
- Ryan Jackson 1991
- Eric Jagielo 2012
- Kevin Jarvis 1989
- Pierce Johnson 2010–2011
- Eric Jokisch 2009
- JaCoby Jones 2012
- Scott Kamieniecki 1984
- Niko Kavadas 2019
- Art Kenney 1937
- Seaver King 2023
- George Kirby 2018
- Joe Klink 1982
- Eric Knott 1994
- George Kontos 2005
- Matt Koperniak 2019
- Marc Krauss 2008
- Zach Kroenke 2004
- Blake Lalli 2005
- Lou Lamoriello 1961–1962
- Mike Lansing 1988
- Russ Laribee 1976
- Joe La Sorsa 2018
- Derek Lee 1987
- DJ LeMahieu 2008
- Brent Lillibridge 2004
- Tim Lincecum 2005
- Andre Lipcius 2018
- Eric Ludwick 1992
- Barry Lyons 1979, 1981
- Joe Magrane 1984
- Neil Mahoney 1937–1938
- Mikie Mahtook 2010
- Mitch Maier 2002
- Ben Malgeri 2021
- Trey Mancini 2012
- Chris Manno 2008
- Joe Mantiply 2011
- Shaun Marcum 2002
- Jake McCarthy 2017
- Joe McCarthy 2014
- Sam McConnell 1996
- Marshall McDougall 1999
- Aaron Meade 2009
- Tommy Medica 2008
- Adam Melhuse 1991
- Matt Merullo 1984
- Brian Meyer 1985
- Levi Michael 2010
- Kevin Millar 1992
- David Miller 1993
- Owen Miller 2017
- Adam Morgan 2010
- Hal Morris 1985
- Taylor Motter 2010
- Kevin Mulvey 2004–2005
- Heath Murray 1993
- Kyler Murray 2017
- Charles Nagy 1987
- Packy Naughton 2016
- Jim Negrych 2005
- John Nelson 1999
- Sheldon Neuse 2015
- Josh Newman 2002
- Jeff Niemann 2002–2003
- Aaron Nola 2012
- Austin Nola 2010–2011
- Rafael Novoa 1987–1988
- Dick Offenhamer 1939
- Kirt Ojala 1989
- Adam Ottavino 2005
- Pat Pacillo 1982–1983
- Jake Palisch 2019
- Graham Pauley 2022
- Mike Pazik 1968–1969
- Greg Peavey 2010
- Carlos Peña 1996
- Dillon Peters 2013
- Tyler Pill 2010
- Jared Poché 2014
- Ross Powell 1988
- Chris Pritchett 1990
- Matt Pushard 2021
- Matt Quatraro 1994–1995
- Dan Radison 1970
- Cal Raleigh 2016
- Matt Ramsey 2010
- A. J. Reed 2012–2013
- Mark Reynolds 2003
- Eric Reyzelman 2021–2022
- Bill Richardson 1968
- Aiden Robbins 2024–2025
- Mike Robertson 1989–1990
- Taylor Rogers 2011
- Matt Ruebel 1989
- Alex Sanchez 1986
- Jonathan Santucci 2022
- Joe Saunders 2001
- Tim Scannell 1989
- Cam Schlittler 2021
- Aaron Schunk 2018
- Darryl Scott 1988
- Bob Seymour 2019
- Carson Seymour 2019
- Chandler Shepherd 2013
- Kelly Shoppach 2000
- Jim Siwy 1979
- Scott Sizemore 2005
- Frank Skaff 1933
- Eric Skoglund 2012
- Josh Smith 2017
- Pavin Smith 2016
- Cory Snyder 1983
- Peter Solomon 2016
- Noah Song 2017
- Paul Sorrento 1985
- Garrett Stallings 2018
- Adam Stern 2000
- Mel Stottlemyre Jr. 1984
- Todd Stottlemyre 1985
- Chris Stratton 2011
- Sean Sullivan 2022
- Darnell Sweeney 2011
- R. J. Swindle 2003
- Kyle Teel 2022
- Dave Telgheder 1987
- Clete Thomas 2004
- Wyatt Toregas 2003
- Bob Tufts 1975
- Brian Turang 1988
- Brant Ust 1997
- Chris Vallimont 2017
- Anthony Varvaro 2004
- Cam Vieaux 2015
- Matt Vierling 2017
- Luke Voit 2011
- Christian Walker 2011
- Kevin Ward 1981–1982
- Tony Watson 2006
- Zach Watson 2018
- Terry Wells 1984
- Joey Wiemer 2019
- Brock Wilken 2021–2022
- Antone Williamson 1992
- Austin Wilson 2011–2012
- J. T. Wise 2007
- Ron Witmeyer 1987
- Brandon Woodruff 2012
- Mike Wright 2010
- Ed Yarnall 1995
- Mark Zagunis 2013
- Josh Zeid 2007
- Brad Ziegler 2002
- Alan Zinter 1988

== Yearly results ==
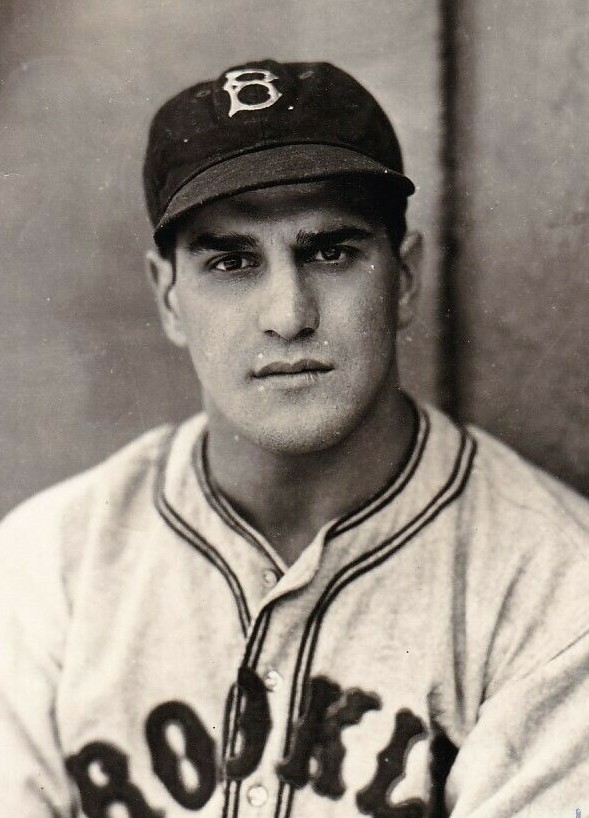
Frank Skaff was an all-league outfielder for Harwich's 1933 title club, and went on to play for the Brooklyn Dodgers

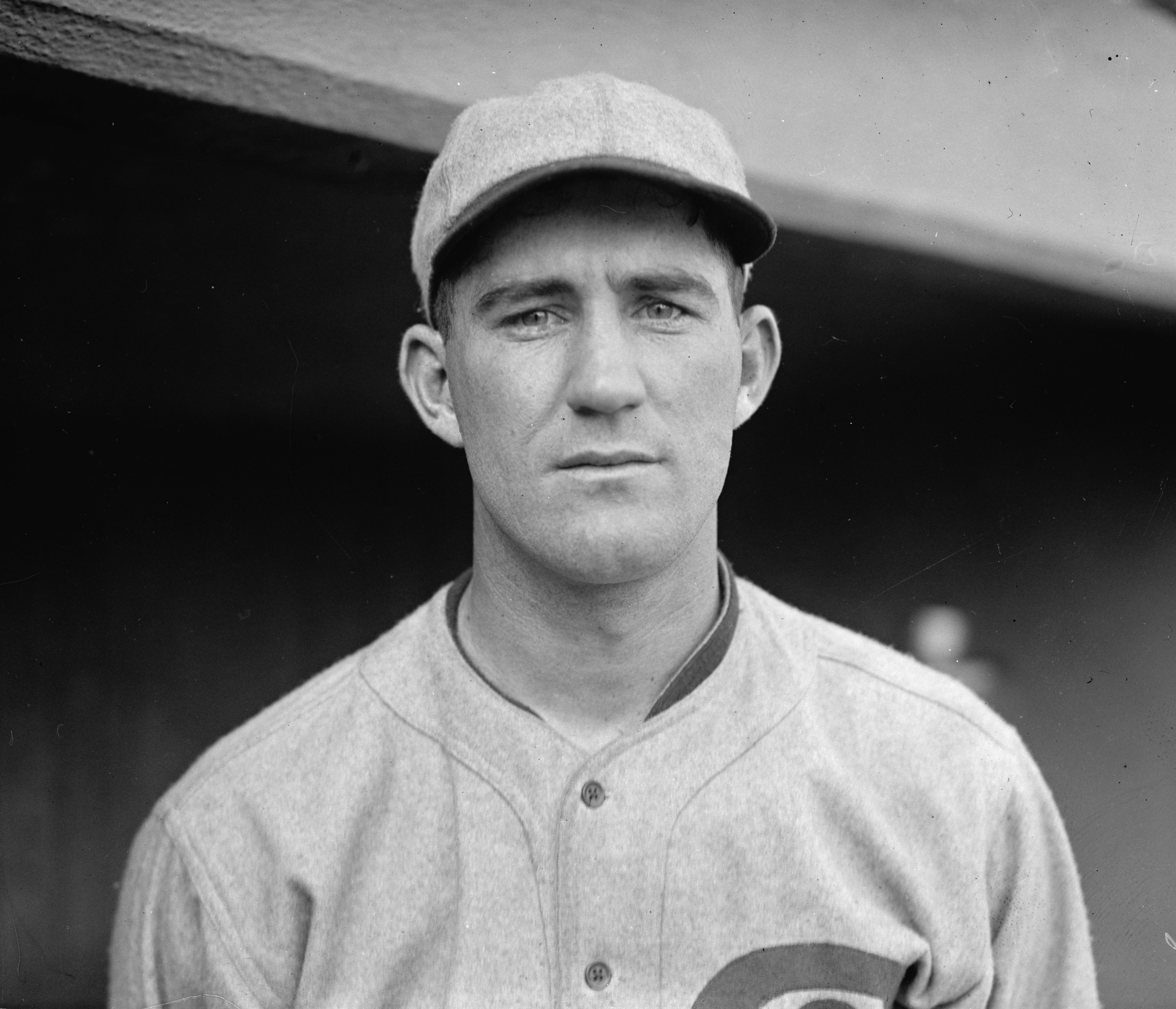
Harwich's Bill Barrett led the Cape League with a .440 batting average in 1937.

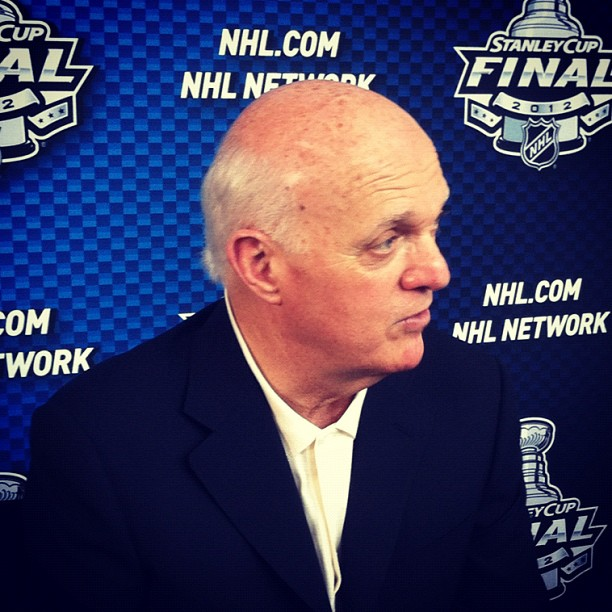
CCBL Hall of Famer Lou Lamoriello played for Harwich in 1961 and 1962

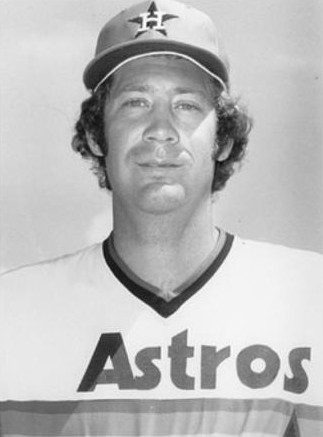
Mike Barlow played for Harwich in 1969

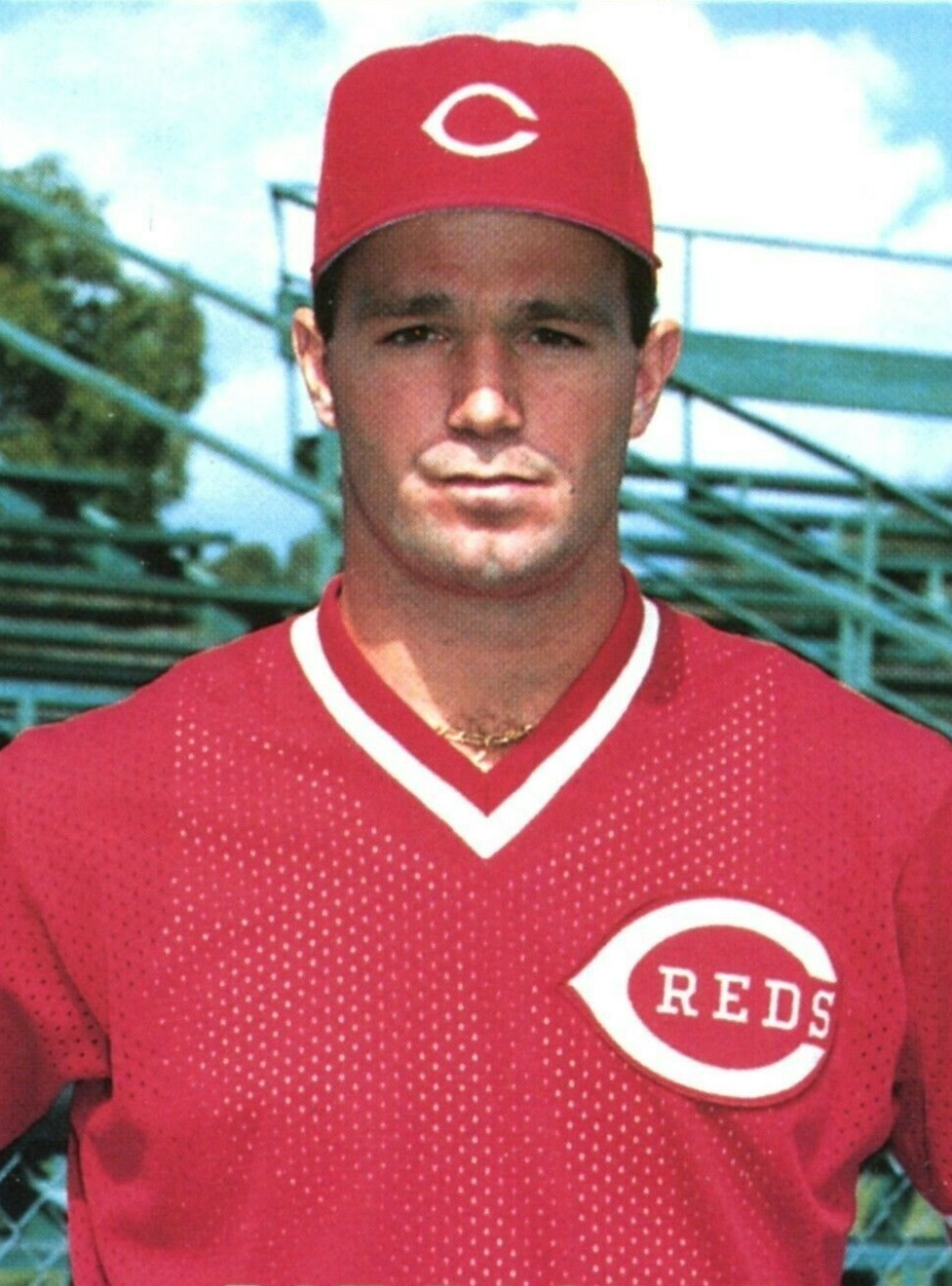
CCBL Hall of Famer Pat Pacillo of Harwich's 1983 league champs

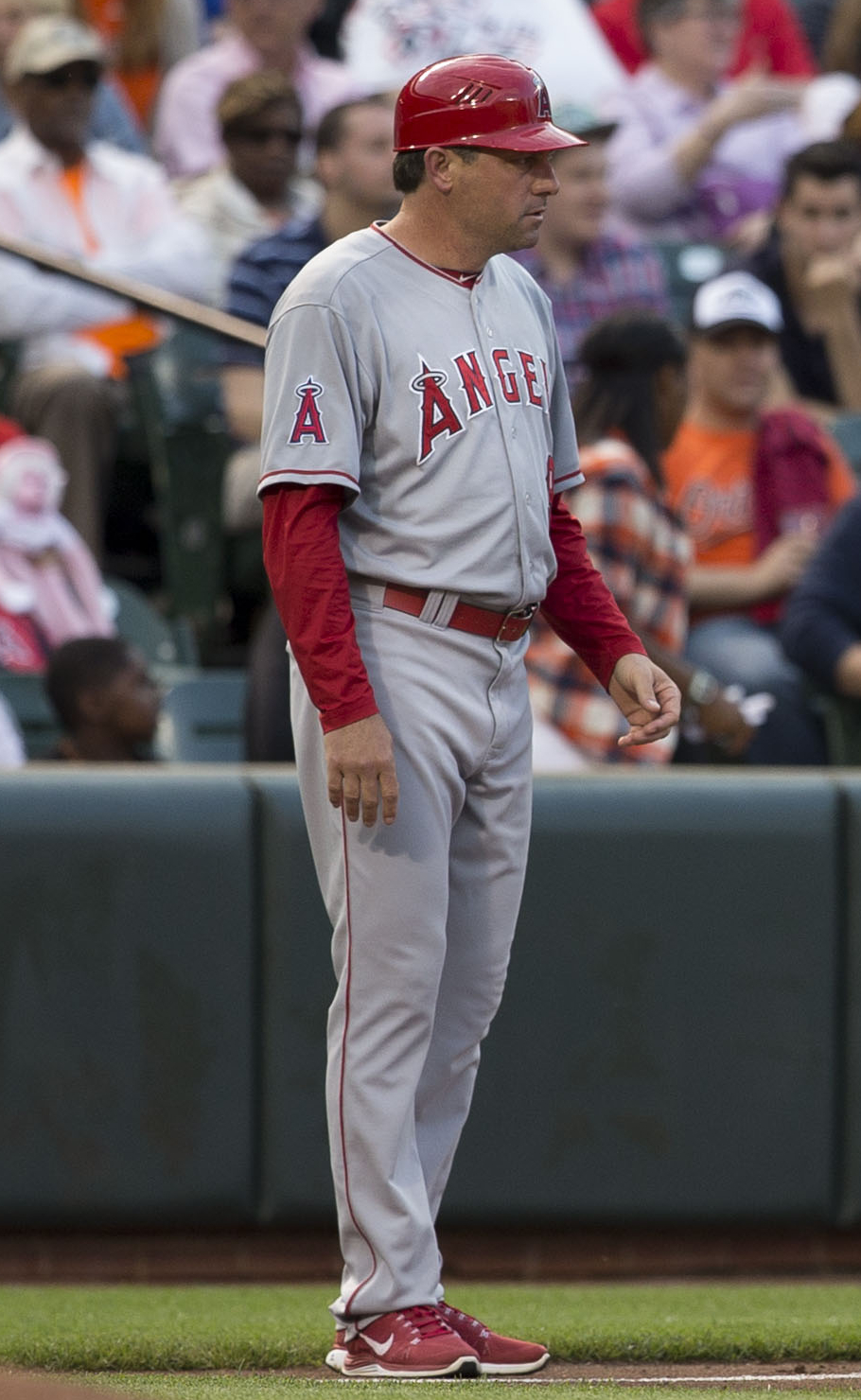
Gary DiSarcina played on the 1987 Mariners championship team

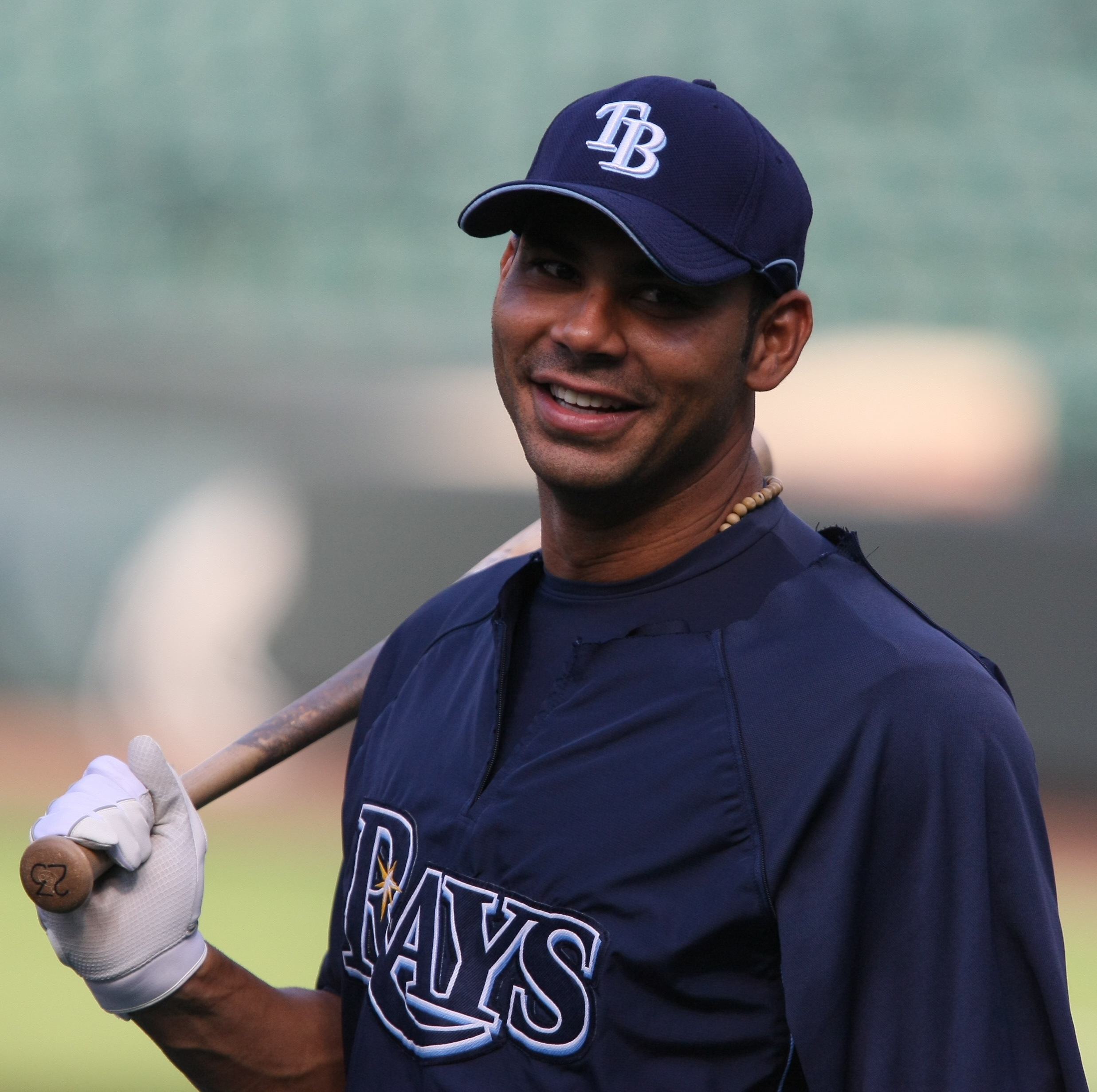
CCBL Hall of Famer Carlos Peña played for Harwich in 1996

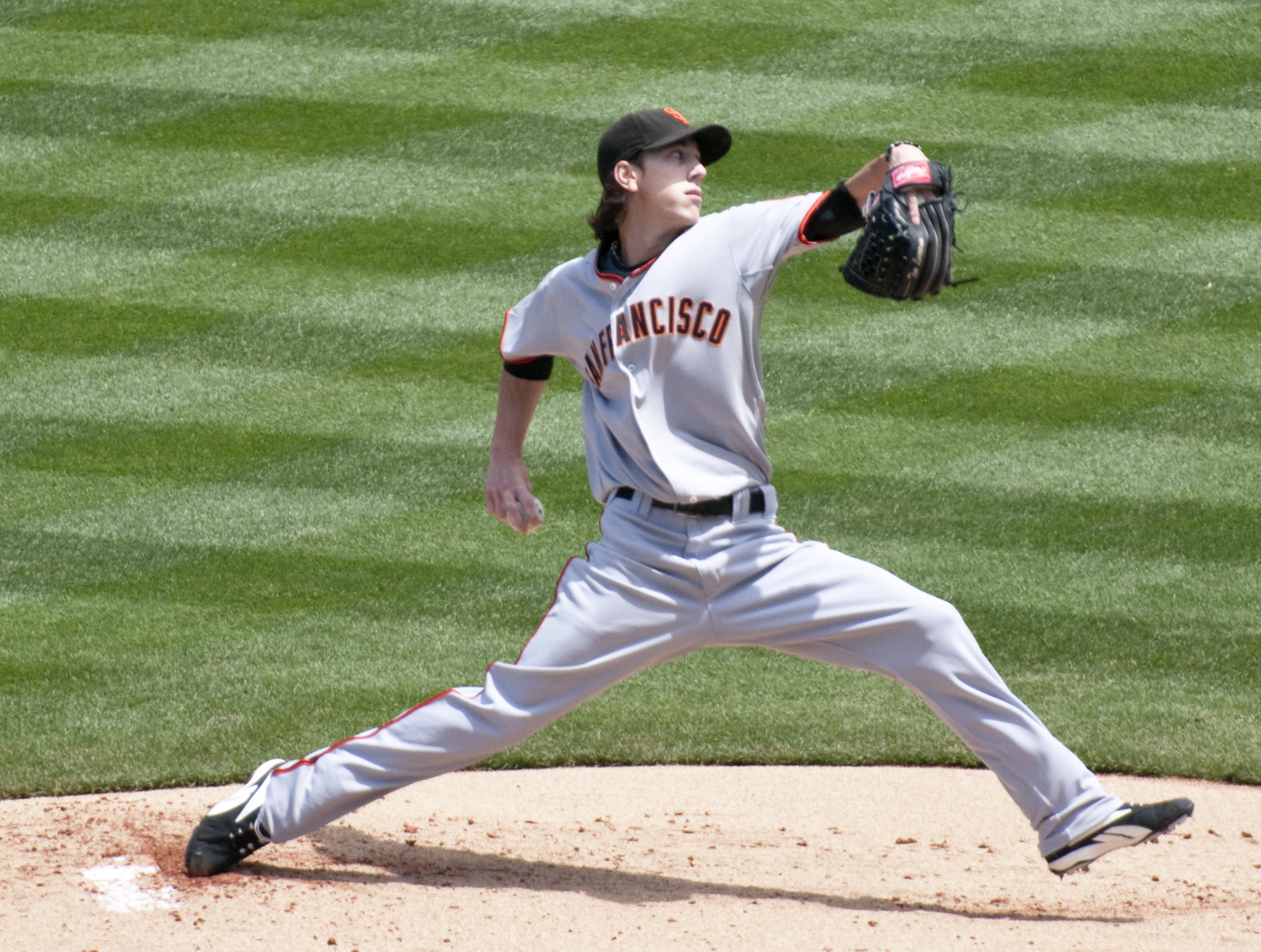
Tim Lincecum pitched for the Mariners in 2005

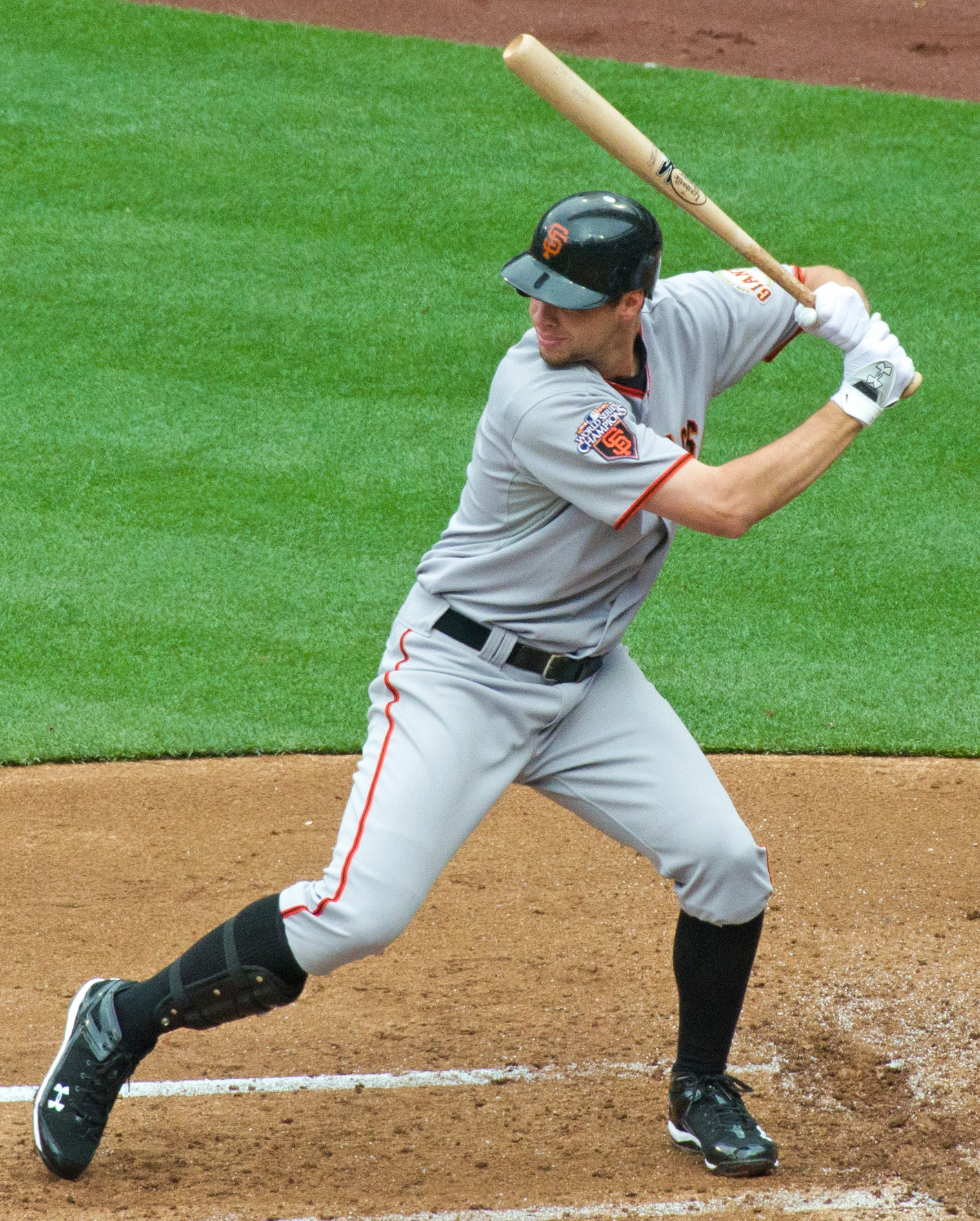
Brandon Belt won a CCBL championship with Harwich in 2008

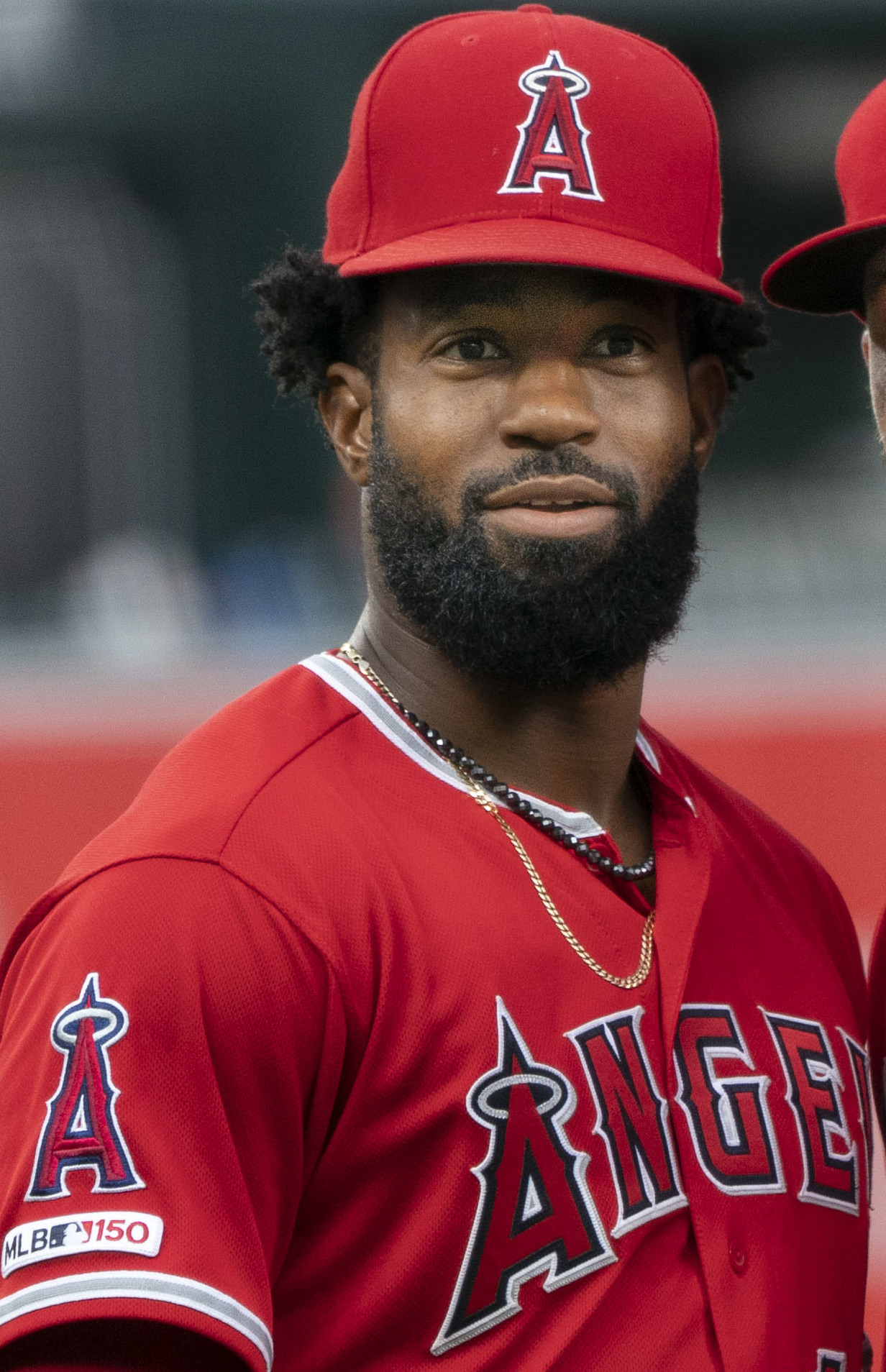
Brian Goodwin of the 2010 Harwich club

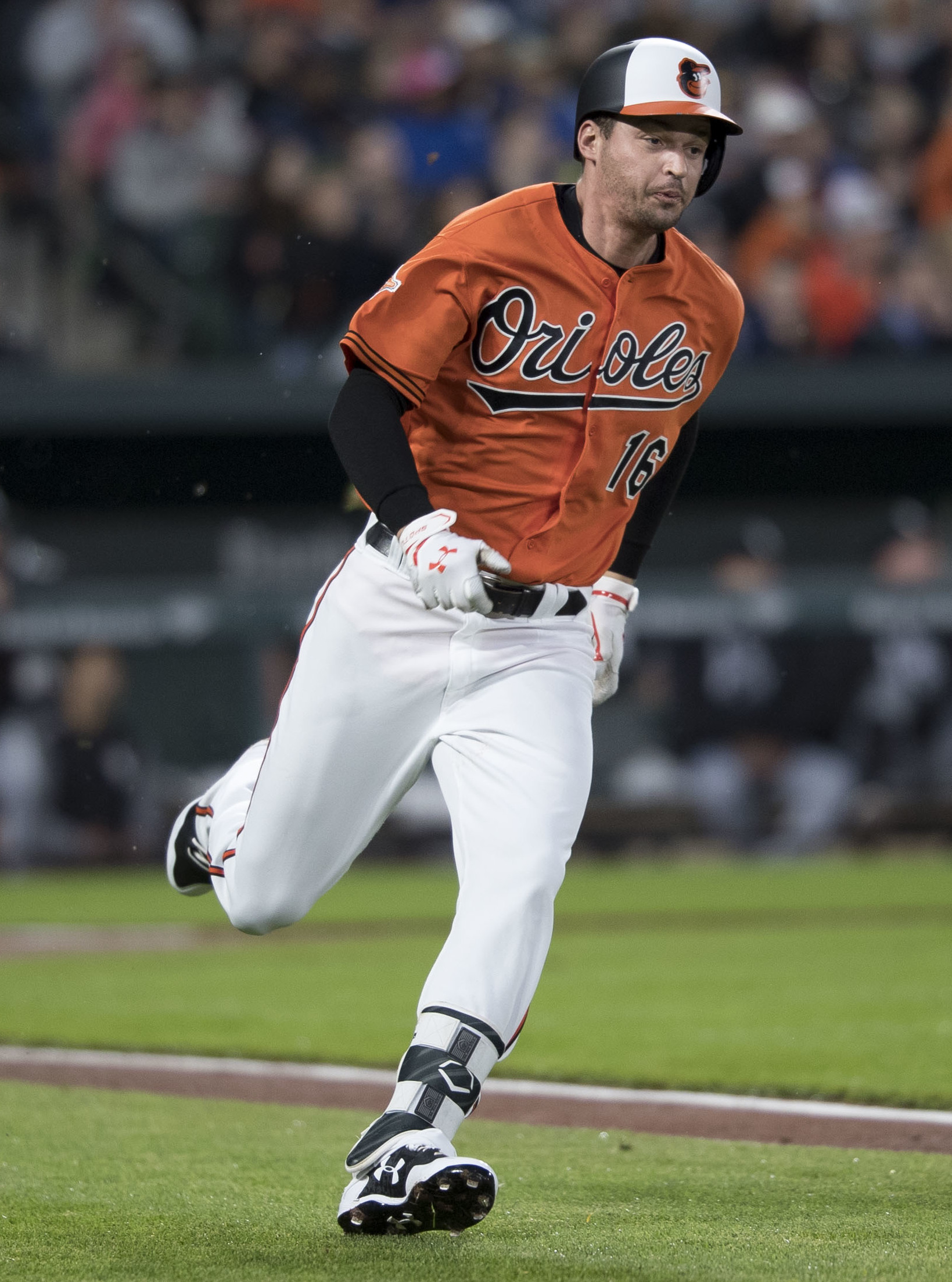
2012 Harwich Mariner Trey Mancini

=== Results by season, 1927–1939 ===
Year	Won	Lost	Regular Season Finish	Postseason*	Manager	Ref
1927^{†}	16	20	4th League		Frank Davies	
1928^{†}	22	22	3rd League		Robert Cushman	
1929^{†}	23	21	2nd League		Johnny Mitchell	
1930	17	27	6th League		Lucius "Jeff" Jones	
1931	17	31	6th League		Lucius "Jeff" Jones	
1932	21	13	2nd League		Joe Harraghy	
1933	31	18	3rd League (A); 1st League (B)	Won championship (Falmouth)	Joe Harraghy	
1934	20	27	5th League		Mike Welch	
1935	16	30	4th League (A); 2nd League (B)		George Colbert	
1936	23	25	3rd League (A); 3rd League (B)		Bill Boehner	
1937	27	19	2nd League		Neil Mahoney	
1938	31	23	2nd League		Neil Mahoney	
1939	32	21	2nd League (A); 2nd League (B)		Marty McDonough	

* During the CCBL's 1923–1939 era, postseason playoffs were a rarity. In most years, the regular season pennant winner was simply crowned as the league champion.
However, there were four years in which the league split its regular season and crowned separate champions for the first (A) and second (B) halves. In two of those
seasons (1936 and 1939), a single team won both halves and was declared overall champion. In the other two split seasons (1933 and 1935), a postseason
playoff series was contested between the two half-season champions to determine the overall champion.
^{†} Played from 1927 to 1929 as combined "Chatham-Harwich" team

=== Results by season, 1946–1962 ===
Harwich
Year	Won	Lost	Regular Season Finish*	Postseason	Manager	Ref
1946				Won semi-finals (Barnstable); Lost championship (Falmouth)	Charley Jones	
1947				Lost semi-finals (Orleans)	Jim Baldwin	
1948					Jim Baldwin	
1949						
1950	28	14	2nd Lower Cape Division			
1951	24	12	3rd Lower Cape Division (A); T-2nd Lower Cape Division (B)			
1952						
1953	13	22	4th Lower Cape Division (A); 5th Lower Cape Division (B)			
1954						
1955	14	16	5th Lower Cape Division		Francis Hibbert	
1956	11	23	5th Lower Cape Division			
1957	12	25	5th Lower Cape Division			
1958	10	20	5th Lower Cape Division			
1959	18	12	2nd Lower Cape Division	Lost round 1 (Orleans)		
1960	17	15	2nd Lower Cape Division (T)	Won round 1 (Orleans); Lost semi-finals (Yarmouth)		
1961	14	17	4th Lower Cape Division	Lost round 1 (Yarmouth)	Francis Hibbert	
1962	13	17	2nd Lower Cape Division (T)	Won round 1 (Orleans); Won semi-finals (Chatham); Lost championship (Cotuit)	Dave Gavitt	

Cape Verdeans (1949–1950)
Year	Won	Lost	Regular Season Finish*	Postseason	Manager	Ref
1949						
1950	5	34	8th Lower Cape Division			

* Regular seasons split into first and second halves are designated as (A) and (B).

=== Results by season, 1963–present ===
Year	Won	Lost	Tied	Regular Season Finish	Postseason	Manager
1963	12	21	0	4th Lower Cape Division		Don Stanford
1964	12	18	0	4th Lower Cape Division		Ray Yetten
1965	10	23	0	4th Lower Cape Division		Ray Yetten
1966	18	16	0	3rd Lower Cape Division		Tony Williams
1967	13	26	0	4th Lower Cape Division		Tony Williams
1968	26	13	0	1st Lower Cape Division	Lost championship (Falmouth)	John Carroll
1969	18	25	0	4th Lower Cape Division		John Carroll
1970	11	28	0	7th League		Don Stanford
1971	11	30	1	8th League		Fred Ebbett
1972	16	25	1	5th League		Fred Ebbett
1973	15	25	2	7th League		George Woodworth
1974	21	20	1	3rd League	Lost semi-finals (Orleans)	George Woodworth
1975	15	25	2	7th League		Fred Ebbett
1976	20	22	0	5th League		Fred Ebbett
1977	18	22	1	5th League		Fred Ebbett
1978	20	20	2	3rd League	Won semi-finals (Chatham); Lost championship (Hyannis)	Don Prohovich
1979	21	20	0	3rd League	Won semi-finals (Cotuit); Lost championship (Hyannis)	Don Prohovich
1980	14	27	1	7th League		Don Prohovich
1981	23	17	2	2nd League	Lost semi-finals (Orleans)	Don Prohovich
1982	17	24	0	7th League		Don Prohovich
1983	24	17	1	3rd League	Won semi-finals (Wareham); Won championship (Cotuit)	Steve Ring
1984	27	15	0	1st League	Lost semi-finals (Wareham)	Steve Ring
1985	22	18	2	3rd League	Lost semi-finals (Cotuit)	Steve Ring
1986	18	24	0	6th League		Steve Ring
1987	26	15	0	1st League	Won semi-finals (Cotuit); Won championship (Y-D)	Bill Springman
1988	21	22	0	3rd East Division		Mike Kinnersley
1989	19	24	1	4th East Division		Mike Kinnersley
1990	22	21	1	4th East Division		Fran O'Brien
1991	11	33	0	5th East Division		Robin Dreizler
1992	20	23	1	3rd East Division		Steve Ring
1993	11	31	1	5th East Division		Jay Kemble
1994	16	25	2	5th East Division		Bruce Peddie
1995	15	27	1	5th East Division		Jay Kemble
1996	20	22	2	3rd East Division		Mike Maack
1997	22	22	0	1st East Division	Won semi-finals (Chatham); Lost championship (Wareham)	Chad Holbrook
1998	23	21	0	3rd East Division		Billy Best
1999	17	27	0	5th East Division		Scott Lawler
2000	21	21	2	4th East Division		Buddy Custer
2001	19	25	0	4th East Division		Buddy Custer
2002	21	23	0	4th East Division		Buddy Custer
2003	21	22	1	4th East Division (T)		Steve Englert
2004	20	24	0	5th East Division		Steve Englert
2005	21	23	0	3rd East Division		Steve Englert
2006	20	24	0	5th East Division		Steve Englert
2007	14	28	2	5th East Division		Steve Englert
2008	24	20	0	2nd East Division	Won semi-finals (Orleans); Won championship (Cotuit)	Steve Englert
2009	18	25	1	5th East Division		Steve Englert
2010	22	21	1	4th East Division	Lost round 1 (Y-D)	Steve Englert
2011	24	19	1	2nd East Division	Won round 1 (Brewster); Won semi-finals (Y-D); Won championship (Falmouth)	Steve Englert
2012	27	16	1	1st East Division	Lost round 1 (Orleans)	Steve Englert
2013	23	19	2	3rd East Division	Lost round 1 (Orleans)	Steve Englert
2014	26	16	2	1st East Division	Won round 1 (Brewster); Lost semi-finals (Y-D)	Steve Englert
2015	20	22	2	5th East Division		Steve Englert
2016	27	15	2	1st East Division	Lost round 1 (Chatham)	Steve Englert
2017	15	28	1	5th East Division		Steve Englert
2018	18	24	2	3rd East Division	Lost round 1 (Chatham)	Steve Englert
2019	21	21	2	4th East Division	Won round 1 (Chatham); Won semi-finals (Y-D); Lost championship (Cotuit)	Steve Englert
2020	Season cancelled due to coronavirus pandemic					
2021	19	12	5	2nd East Division	Lost semi-finals (Brewster)	Steve Englert
2022	17	21	6	4th East Division	Lost round 1 (Brewster)	Steve Englert
2023	20	23	1	3rd East Division	Lost round 1 (Orleans)	Steve Englert
2024	16	24	0	3rd East Division	Won round 1 (Chatham); Won semi-finals (Y-D); Won championship (Bourne)	Steve Englert
2025	21	16	3	2nd East Division	Won round 1 (Brewster); Lost semi-finals (Y-D)	Steve Englert
2026	21	19	0	3rd East Division	Won round 1 (Brewster); Won semi-finals (Y-D); Won championship (Bourne)	Steve Englert

== League award winners ==
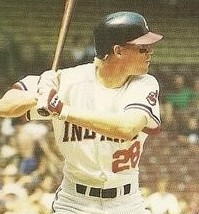
CCBL Hall of Famer Cory Snyder was the league's Outstanding Pro Prospect in 1983, bashing a record 22 homers.

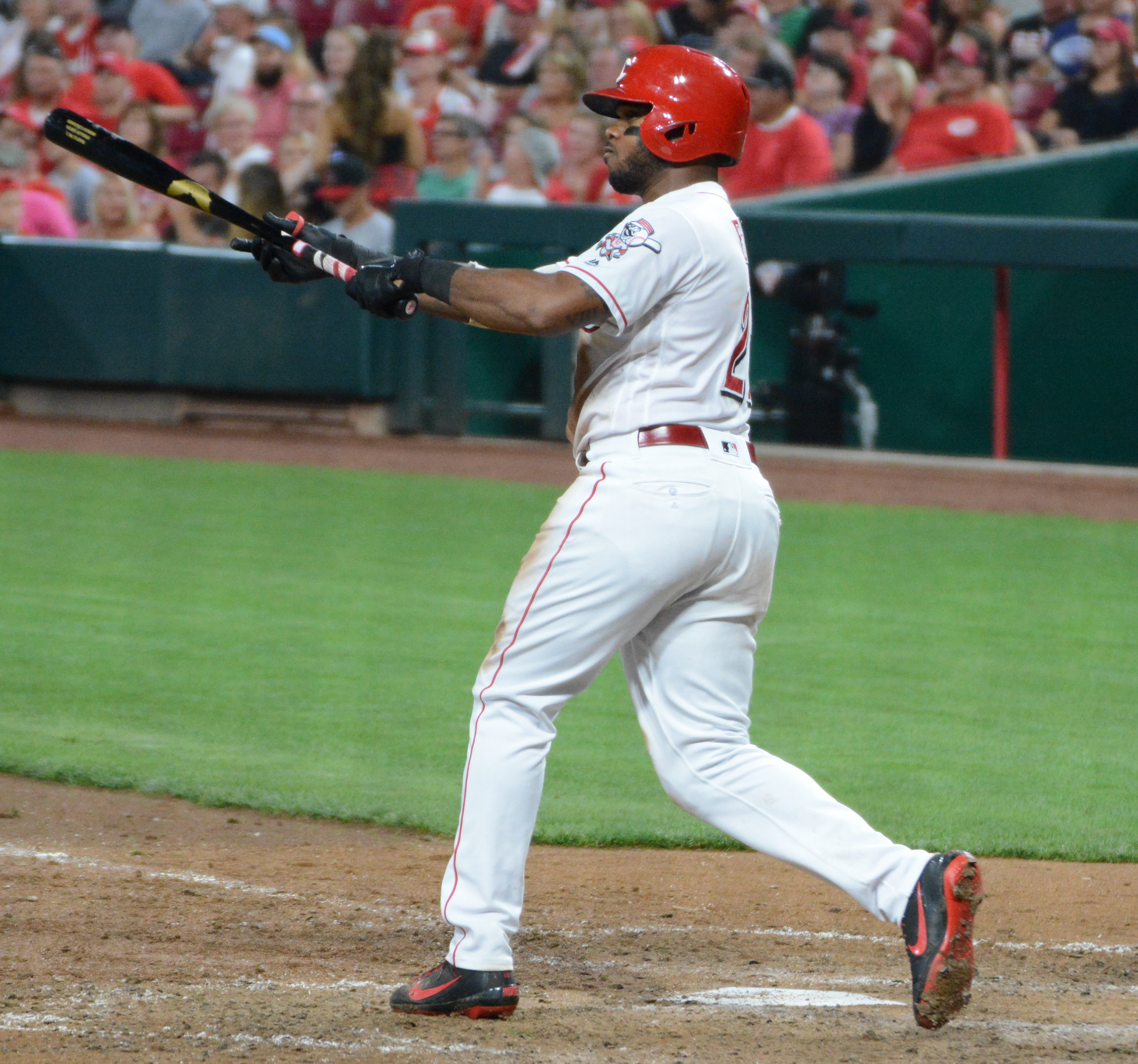
Mariner Phil Ervin was league MVP in 2012

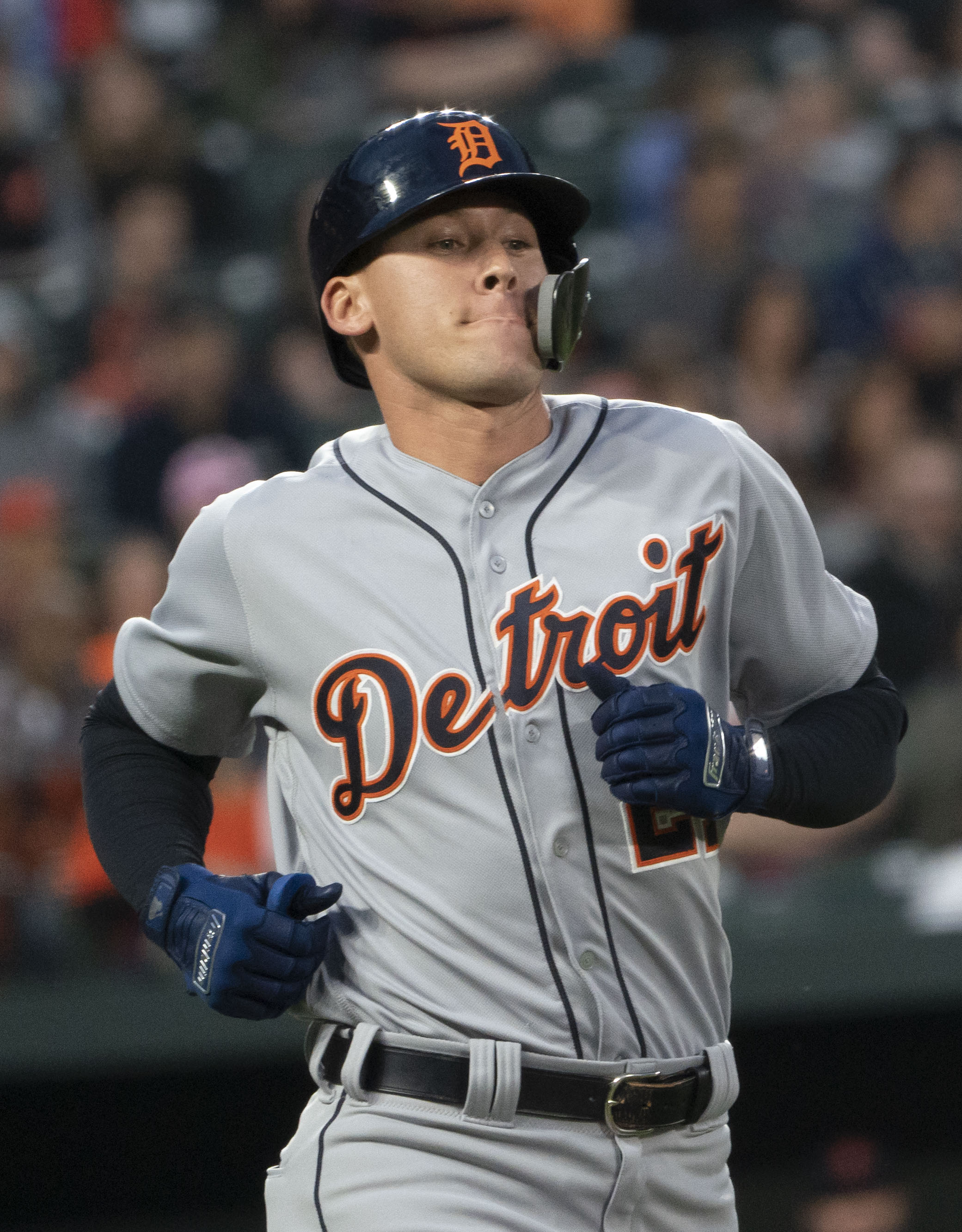
Harwich's JaCoby Jones, 2012 CCBL All-Star Game Home Run Derby champ

The Pat Sorenti MVP Award
Year	Player
1966	Ed Drucker
1986	Scott Hemond
2012	Phil Ervin
2016	Ernie Clement
2021	Brock Wilken
2026	Tyler Smolinski

The Robert A. McNeece Outstanding Pro Prospect Award
Year	Player
1983	Cory Snyder
1984	Mike Loggins

The BFC Whitehouse Outstanding Pitcher Award
Year	Player
1974	Andy Muhlstock
1981	Greg Myers
1982	Scott Murray
1995	Eddie Yarnall*
1996	Billy Coleman
1997	Brent Hoard
2021	Trey Dombroski

The Russ Ford Outstanding Relief Pitcher Award
Year	Player
2002	Shaun Marcum*

The Daniel J. Silva Sportsmanship Award
Year	Player
1979	Gary Kaczor*
1985	Casey Close*
2014	Anthony Hermelyn
2016	Johnny Adams

The Manny Robello 10th Player Award
Year	Player
1994	Matt Quattraro
2008	Andrew Giobbi
2010	Clint Moore
2015	Johnny Adams
2016	Austin Filiere
2018	Andre Lipcius

The John J. Claffey Outstanding New England Player Award
Year	Player
2008	Ryan Quigley
2024	Cam Maldonado
2026	Colin Larson

The Thurman Munson Award for Batting Champion
Year	Player
1986	Scott Hemond (.358)
2025	Aiden Robbins (.307)

All-Star Game MVP Award
Year	Player
1984	Mike Loggins
1989	Jim Austin
1994	Dan Kurtz
2000	Ryan Stegall
2016	B.J. Myers
2025	Tre Broussard

All-Star Home Run Hitting Contest Champion
Year	Player
2009	Connor Powers
2012	JaCoby Jones
2014	Sal Annunziata

The Star of Stars Playoff MVP Award
Year	Player
1987	Charles Nagy
2008	Jason Stidham*
2008	Marc Fleury*
2011	Mike Garza
2024	Wilson Weber
2026	JP Peltier

(*) - Indicates co-recipient

== All-Star Game selections ==
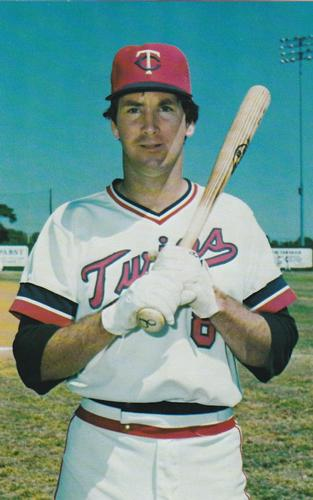
Mariner Glenn Adams homered in the 1967 CCBL All-Star Game.

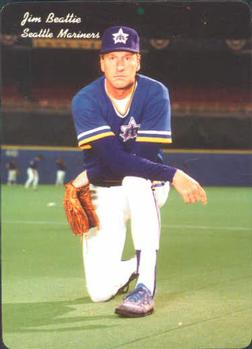
Jim Beattie, 1974 CCBL all-star

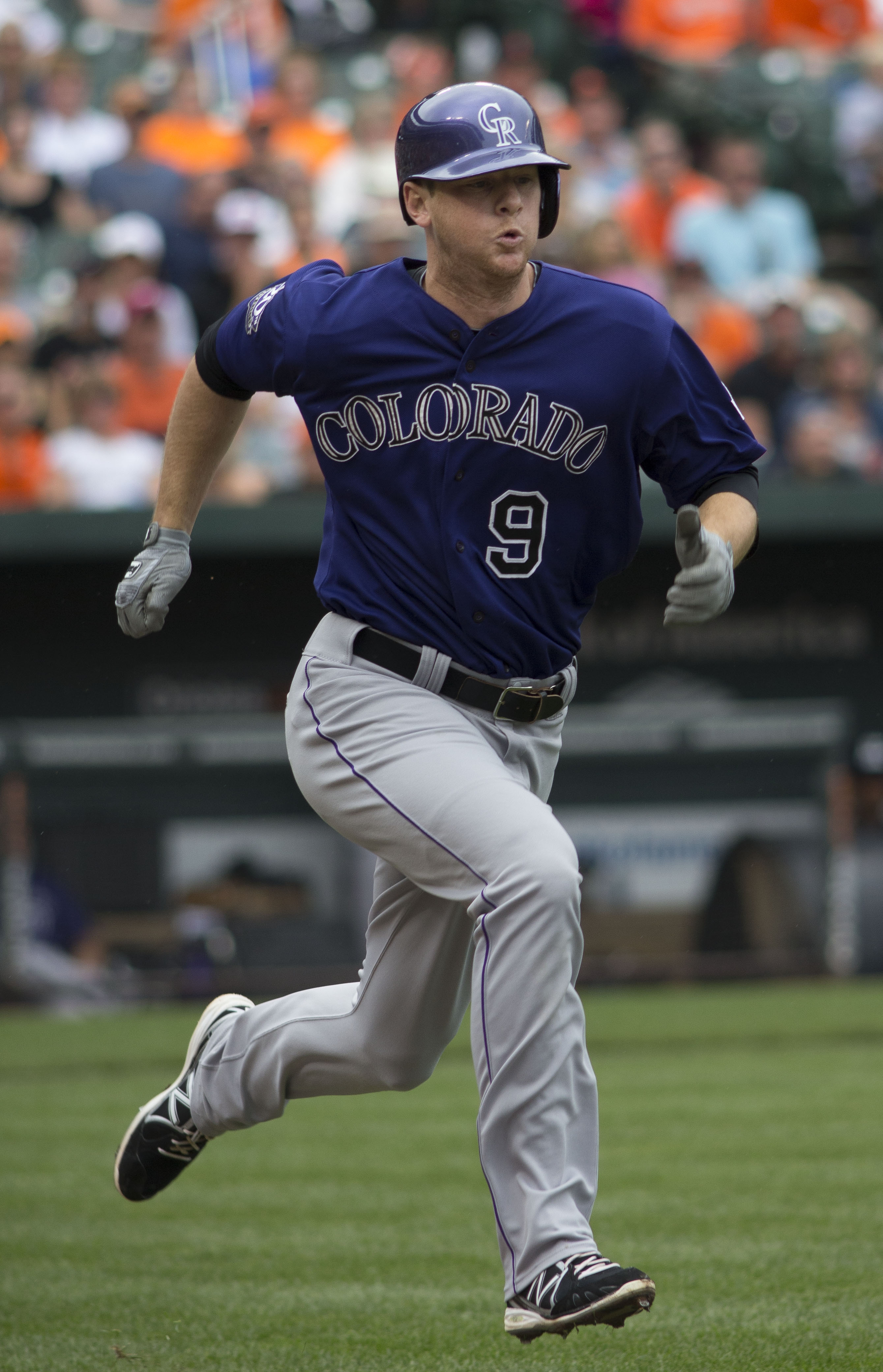
DJ LeMahieu was an all-star for Harwich's 2008 CCBL champs.

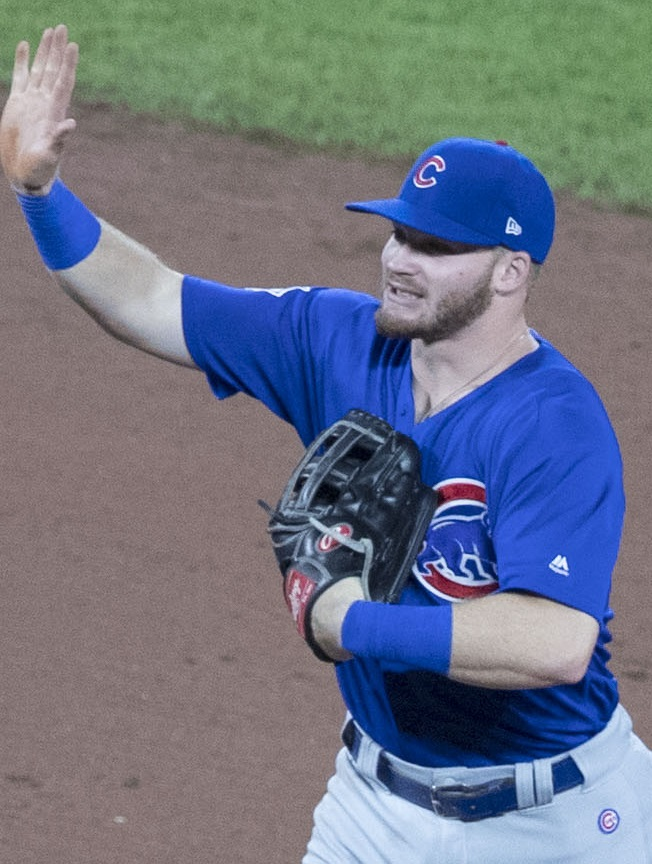
CCBL Hall of Famer Ian Happ, 2013 and 2014 CCBL all-star

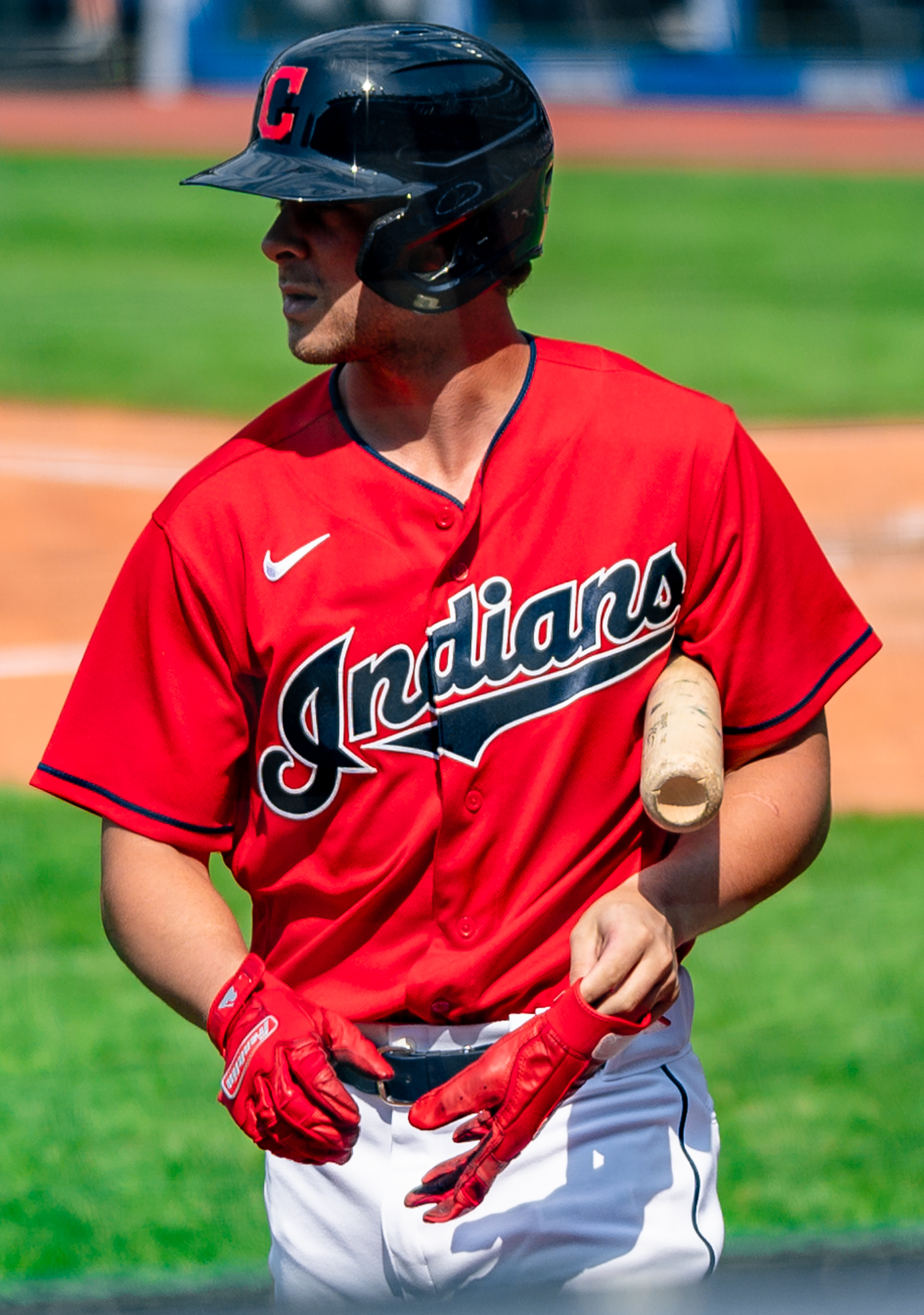
2016 CCBL all-star and league MVP Ernie Clement

Year	Players	Ref
1963	Don Antonangeli, Luke Lambeley	
1964	Dennis Jensen	
1965	Frank Joyal, Ted Mareno	
1966	Calvin Fisk, Pete Ford, Ed Drucker, Bob Chandler, Carl Schlender	
1967	Calvin Fisk, Joe Lasorsa, Glenn Adams	
1968	Pete Ford, Mike Jacobs, John Reid, Fred Levine	
1969	Alan Bush, Mike Pazik	
1970	Dan Radison	
1971	Rex Peters	
1972	Dale Lydecker, Frank Zawatski, Doug Corbett	
1973	Robin Outwater	
1974	Barry Sullivan, Andy Muhlstock, Jim Beattie	
1975	Barry Sullivan	
1976	Abbey Gladstone, Tom Germano	
1977	Larry Brown, Pat Murphy, Gary Masse	
1978	Larry Brown, Pat Murphy, Paul Voight, Gerry Davis	
1979	Ted Rockwell	
1980	John Cerutti	
1981	Gary Miller-Jones, Tim Byron, Barry Lyons	
1982	Andy Allanson	
1983	Cory Snyder, Jay Hunt, Robbie Souza	
1984	Casey Close, Mike Loggins, Jeff Gardner, Scott Kamieniecki	
1985	Casey Close, Todd Stottlemyre, Brian Meyer	
1986	Scott Hemond, Alex Sanchez	
1987	Steve Arriete	
1988	Rick Hirtensteiner, Brian Ahern, Darryl Scott, John Byington	
1989	Mike Truschke, Scott Campbell, Chris Martin, James Austin, Steve Wolf	
1990	Carmine Cappuccio, Nick Sproviero	
1991	Pat Leahy	
1992	Gerad Cawhorn, Reed Aljian, Terry Harvey, Chuck Kulle	
1993	Bob Ribinski	
1994	Ryan Kane, Dan Kurtz	
1995	Pat Cutshall, Eddie Ferrer, Ed Yarnall, Josh Potter	
1996	Pat Cutshall, Jody Gerut, Billy Coleman	
1997	Justin Ross, Jeff Wagner, Jason Trott, Andy Lee, Brent Hoard, Sonny Cortez	
1998	Rodney Nye, B.J. Green	
1999	Charles Bilezikjian, Kevin Zaug	
2000	Ryan Stegall, Jason Bartlett, Adam Stern, Rob Moravek	
2001	Burney Hutchinson, Joe Saunders, Luke Robertson	
2002	Chris Snavely, Mitch Maier, Brad Ziegler, Shaun Marcum, Cesar Nicolas	
2003	Brad McCann, Justin Hedrick	
2004	Jon Aughey, Ben Copeland, John Slone, Dan Brauer, Craig Hansen	
2005	Scott Sizemore, Chris Emanuele, Tim Lincecum, Chad Flack	
2006	Antone DeJesus, Tony Watson, Dan Merklinger, Josh Donaldson	
2007	Cole Figueroa, Kyle Day, Corey Young, Evan Crawford, Chris Dominguez	
2008	Mark Fleury, DJ LeMahieu, Chris Manno, Brian Dupra, J. J. Hoover	
2009	Daniel Grovatt, Aaron Meade, Connor Powers	
2010	Pratt Maynard, Clint Moore, Levi Michael, Ronnie Richardson, Matty Ott, Braden Kapteyn, Adam Morgan	
2011	Taylor Rogers, Jabari Henry, Luke Voit, Chris Overman, Carter Capps, Austin Wilson	
2012	Phillip Ervin, David Whitehead, Eric Jagielo, JaCoby Jones, Brian Ragira	
2013	Ian Happ, Branden Cogswell, Derek Fisher, Aaron Bummer, Chandler Shepherd, Jalen Beeks	
2014	Ian Happ, Kyle Barrett, Anthony Hermelyn, Matt Gonzales, Jacob Evans, Sal Annunziata	
2015	Cavan Biggio, Johnny Adams, Adam Pate, Luke Scherzer, Spencer Trayner	
2016	Ernie Clement, Joe Dunand, Pavin Smith, B.J. Myers, Hunter Williams, Peter Solomon, Zach Schellenger, Packy Naughton, Shane McCarthy	
2017	Cobie Vance, Nick Dalesandro, Tyler Baum	
2018	Aaron Schunk, Tanner Morris, Andre Lipcius, Andrew Misiaszek, Tom Sutera	
2019	Christian Fedko, Daniel Cabrera, Joe Boyle, Connor McCullough, Will Heflin, Jake Palisch, Joey Wiemer Jr., Chris Galland, Niko Kavadas	
2020	Season cancelled due to coronavirus pandemic	
2021	Brock Wilken, Tatem Levins, Pres Cavenaugh, Chris Newell, Carter Putz, Trey Dombroski, Andrew Mosiello, Eric Reyzelman, Owen Coady	
2022	Joe Vetrano, Nick Goodwin, Tommy Seidl, Zane Probst, Drew Conover, Brock Wilken	
2023	Bryan Arendt, Ali Camarillo, Tom Chmielewski, Mason Guerra, Aiden Moza, Devin Obee	
2024	Cade Kurland, Cam Maldonado, Jake Ogden	
2025	Tre Broussard, Dee Kennedy, Tanner Marsh, Maddox Molony, Aiden Robbins, Christian Rodriguez, Kyle Wolff	
2026	Nate Castellon, Quinton Coats, Colin Larson, JP Peltier, Tyler Smoliniski	

Italics - Indicates All-Star Game Home Run Hitting Contest participant (1988 to present)

== No-hit games ==
Year	Pitcher	Opponent	Score	Location	Notes	Ref
1963	Don Antonangeli	Yarmouth	4–0	Simpkins Field		
1967	Joe Lasorsa	Yarmouth	2–0	Simpkins Field	5-inning game	
2016	Peter Solomon	Chatham	10–0	Veterans Field	Combined	
2016	Zach Schellenger	Chatham	10–0	Veterans Field	Combined	
2016	Tommy DeJuneas	Chatham	10–0	Veterans Field	Combined	
2016	Nick Brown	Chatham	10–0	Veterans Field	Combined	
2018	Zack Hess	Bourne	1–0	Whitehouse Field	7-inning game; Combined	
2018	Kyle Brnovich	Bourne	1–0	Whitehouse Field	7-inning game; Combined	
2018	Joe La Sorsa	Bourne	1–0	Whitehouse Field	7-inning game; Combined	
2019	Jake Palisch	Orleans	2–0	Eldredge Park	7-inning game	
2019	Connor McCullough	Chatham	1–0	Veterans Field	Playoff game; Combined	
2019	Joe Boyle	Chatham	1–0	Veterans Field	Playoff game; Combined	

== Managerial history ==
Manager	Seasons	Total Seasons	Championship Seasons
Dave Gavitt	1962	1	
Don Stanford	1963	1	
Ray Yetten	1964–1965	2	
Tony Williams	1966–1967	2	
John Carroll	1968–1969	2	
Don Stanford	1970	1	
Fred Ebbett	1971–1972; 1975–1977	5	
George Woodworth	1973–1974	2	
Don Prohovich	1978–1982	5	
Steve Ring	1983–1986; 1992	5	1983
Bill Springman	1987	1	1987
Mike Kinnersley	1988–1989	2	
Fran O'Brien	1990	1	
Robin Dreizler	1991	1	
Jay Kemble	1993; 1995	2	
Bruce Peddie	1994	1	
Mike Maack	1996	1	
Chad Holbrook	1997	1	
Billy Best	1998	1	
Scott Lawler	1999	1	
Buddy Custer	2000–2002	3	
Steve Englert	2003–2026	23*	2008, 2011, 2024, 2026

(*) - Season count excludes 2020 CCBL season cancelled due to coronavirus pandemic.

== See also ==
- Harwich Mariners players
