= Chatham =

Chatham may refer to:

== Military ==
- HMS Chatham, fifteen ships of the Royal Navy
- USS Chatham, four ships of the United States Navy
- CFB Chatham, Chatham, New Brunswick, Canada, a former Canadian Forces base

== People ==
- Chatham (surname), includes a list of notable people with the surname
- Chatham Roberdeau Wheat (1826–1862), American and Confederate officer, politician, lawyer and mercenary
- Earl of Chatham and Baron Chatham, extinct titles in the Peerage of Great Britain
  - William Pitt, 1st Earl of Chatham (1708–1778), British statesman, known toponymically as Chatham
  - John Pitt, 2nd Earl of Chatham (1756–1835), British statesman and general

== Places ==
=== Canada ===
- Chatham, New Brunswick, a former town, now a neighbourhood of Miramichi
- Chatham Parish, New Brunswick, a geographic parish
- Chatham (electoral district), New Brunswick, Canada (1973–1994)
- Chatham Township, Ontario, a former township
- Chatham, a community in Chatham-Kent, Ontario
- Chatham, a former township in Brownsburg-Chatham, Quebec

=== New Zealand ===
- Chatham Islands, a remote eastern archipelago
  - Chatham Island, the largest island of the archipelaho

=== United Kingdom ===
- Chatham, Kent, a town in England
  - Chatham Dockyard, frequently referred to simply as "Chatham"
  - Chatham (UK Parliament constituency) (1832–1950)
- Chatham, Caerphilly, a location in Wales

=== United States ===
- Chatham, Alaska, known after its Chatham Seaplane Base
- Chatham, Connecticut, the name for East Hampton, Connecticut, up to 1915
- Chatham, Florida, an unincorporated community within Everglades National Park
- Chatham, Illinois, a village
- Chatham, Chicago, Illinois, a neighborhood
- Chatham, Iowa
- Chatham, Bracken County, Kentucky
- Chatham, Louisiana
- Chatham, Massachusetts, a town on Cape Cod
  - Chatham (CDP), Massachusetts, village in the town
- Chatham, Michigan, a village
- Chatham, Mississippi
- Chatham, New Hampshire, a town
- Chatham Borough, New Jersey
- Chatham Township, New Jersey, a township that adjoins the borough
- Chatham (town), New York
  - Chatham (village), New York
- Chatham, Licking County, Ohio, an unincorporated community
- Chatham, Medina County, Ohio, an unincorporated community
- Chatham, Pennsylvania
  - Chatham Village (Pittsburgh), Pennsylvania, a National Historic Landmark and community in Pittsburgh
- Chatham, Virginia, a town

== Schools ==
- Chatham University, a private university in Pittsburgh, Pennsylvania, United States
- Chatham High School (disambiguation)

== Other uses ==
- Chatham (film), directed by Daniel Adams
- Chatham (grocer), a defunct American grocery chain in Michigan, United States
- The Chatham, a bar in Monte Carlo, Monaco, from 1946 to 1996
- Chatham (horse), Australian thoroughbred racehorse that raced from 1931 to 1934
- Chatham (ward), in the London Borough of Hackney (1965–2014)

== See also ==
- Chatham County
- Chatham Square
- Chatham Green, a hamlet in Essex
- Chatham Hall, a grade 9-12 girls' boarding school in Chatham, Virginia, United States
- Chatham Grammar School for Girls, a girls grammar school in Chatham/Gillingham, Kent, England
