= Monomoy =

Monomoy usually refers to Monomoy Island off of the coast of Cape Cod, Massachusetts. It may also refer to:

- Monomoy Island Gunnery Range
- Monomoy National Wildlife Refuge
- Monomoy Wilderness inside the MNWR
- Monomoy Point Light in Chatham, Massachusetts
- Monomoy Shoals off the coast
- Monomoy Regional High School, serving Harwich and Chatham, Massachusetts

== Ships ==
- USS Monomoy (AG-40), a cargo ship of the US Navy commissioned in 1918 and eventual US Coast Guard Cutter
- USCGC Monomoy (WAG-275), the former USS Monomoy
- USCGC Monomoy (WPB 1326), a US Coast Guard Cutter commissioned in 1989
