= Barrier Dunes =

Mountain in America

- Location within Massachusetts Location within the United States

Highest point
- Elevation: 2 ft (0.61 m)
- Coordinates: 41°34′22″N 69°59′20″W

Geography
- Location: Cape Cod, Massachusetts
- Topo map: USGS Wellfleet

Barrier Dunes is a mountain in Barnstable County, Massachusetts. It is located on Monomoy Island, 2.3 miles (3.7 km) north-northeast of Monomoy Point in the Town of Chatham.
