= USCGC Monomoy =

Two ships of the United States Coast Guard have been named USCGC Monomoy for the island off the coast of Cape Cod in Massachusetts.

- USCGC Monomoy (WAG-275), a commercial cargo ship acquired by the US Navy and known as USS Monomoy (AG-40), transferred to the Coast Guard 1943, scrapped 1951.
- USCGC Monomoy (WPB-1326), an Island-class patrol cutter commissioned in 1989.
