= West Chatham, Massachusetts =

- Census-designated place
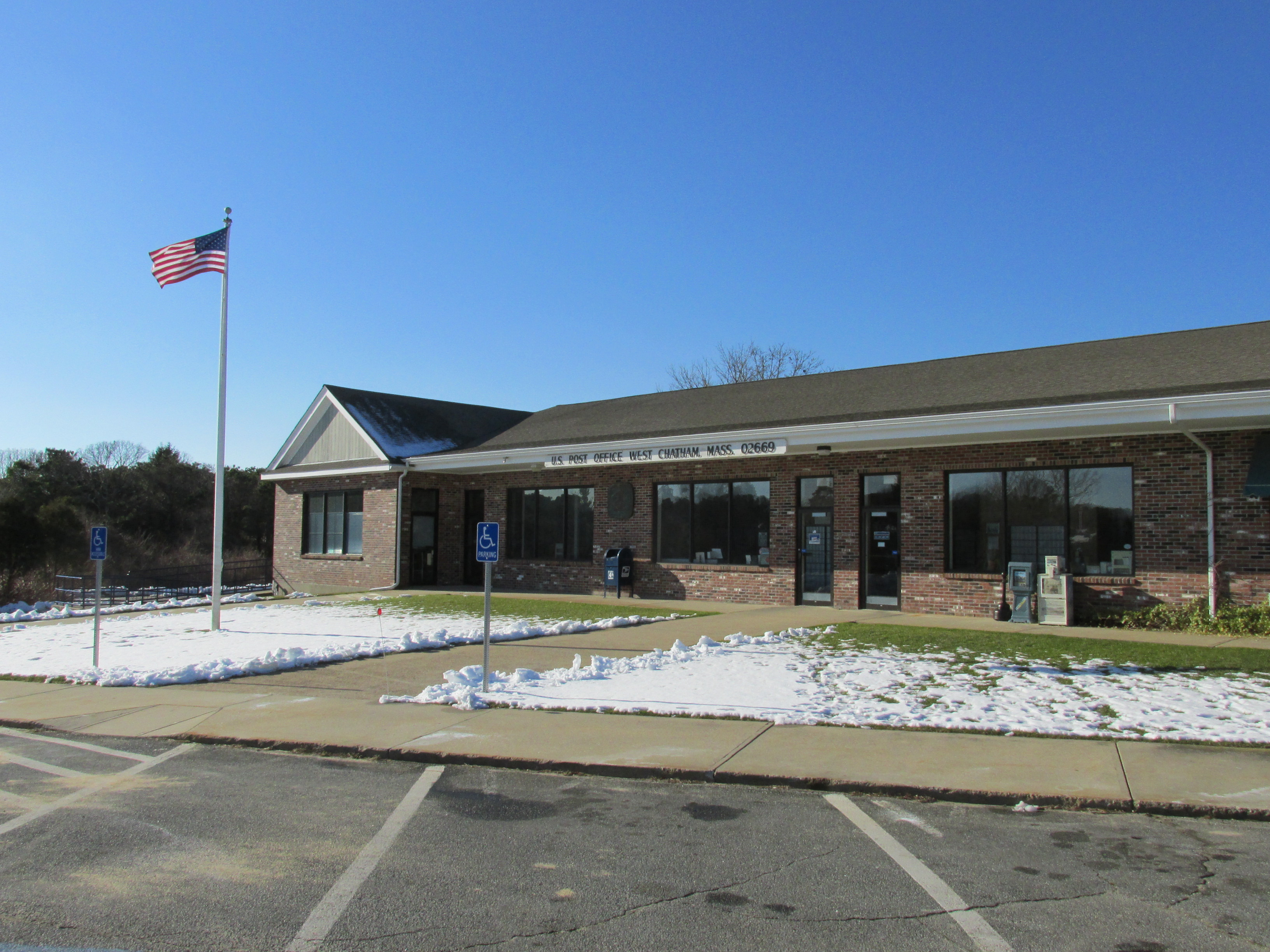
- West Chatham Post Office

- Location in Barnstable County and the state of Massachusetts.
- Coordinates: 41°40′50″N 69°59′15″W
- Country: United States
- State: Massachusetts
- County: Barnstable
- Town: Chatham

Area
  - Total: 3.32 sq mi (8.60 km^{2})
  - Land: 2.92 sq mi (7.57 km^{2})
  - Water: 0.39 sq mi (1.02 km^{2})
- Elevation: 49 ft (15 m)

Population (2020)
  - Total: 1,619
  - Density: 553.6/sq mi (213.75/km^{2})
- Time zone: UTC-5 (Eastern (EST))
  - Summer (DST): UTC-4 (EDT)
- ZIP Codes: 02669 (West Chatham); 02633 (Chatham)
- Area code: 508
- FIPS code: 25-75505
- GNIS feature ID: 0616013

West Chatham is a census-designated place (CDP) in the town of Chatham in Barnstable County, Massachusetts, United States. As of the 2020 census, West Chatham had a population of 1,619.

== Geography ==
West Chatham is located in the southwestern part of the town of Chatham at 41°40′50″N 69°59′15″W (41.680661, -69.987547). It is bordered to the east by the Chatham CDP and to the southwest by Nantucket Sound.

According to the United States Census Bureau, the West Chatham CDP has a total area of 3.3 square miles (8.5 km^{2}), of which 2.9 square miles (7.5 km^{2}) is land, and 0.39 square miles (1.0 km^{2}) (12.06%) is water.

== Demographics ==
Historical population
Census	Pop.	Note	%±
2020	1,619		—
U.S. Decennial Census

=== 2020 census ===
As of the 2020 census, West Chatham had a population of 1,619. The median age was 61.4 years. 10.0% of residents were under the age of 18 and 43.9% of residents were 65 years of age or older. For every 100 females there were 86.3 males, and for every 100 females age 18 and over there were 84.2 males age 18 and over.

100.0% of residents lived in urban areas, while 0.0% lived in rural areas.

There were 825 households in West Chatham, of which 10.8% had children under the age of 18 living in them. Of all households, 49.5% were married-couple households, 17.2% were households with a male householder and no spouse or partner present, and 29.0% were households with a female householder and no spouse or partner present. About 37.0% of all households were made up of individuals and 21.2% had someone living alone who was 65 years of age or older.

There were 1,887 housing units, of which 56.3% were vacant. The homeowner vacancy rate was 2.8% and the rental vacancy rate was 16.8%.

Racial composition as of the 2020 census
Race	Number	Percent
White	1,500	92.6%
Black or African American	44	2.7%
American Indian and Alaska Native	5	0.3%
Asian	10	0.6%
Native Hawaiian and Other Pacific Islander	0	0.0%
Some other race	19	1.2%
Two or more races	41	2.5%
Hispanic or Latino (of any race)	32	2.0%

=== 2000 census ===
As of the census of 2000, there were 1,446 people, 706 households, and 429 families residing in the CDP. The population density was 189.9/km^{2} (491.5/mi^{2}). There were 1,687 housing units at an average density of 221.5/km^{2} (573.5/mi^{2}). The racial makeup of the CDP was 96.06% White, 1.04% Black or African American, 0.14% Native American, 0.21% Asian, 1.52% from other races, and 1.04% from two or more races. Hispanic or Latino of any race were 0.90% of the population.

There were 706 households, out of which 18.0% had children under the age of 18 living with them, 52.4% were married couples living together, 6.1% had a female householder with no husband present, and 39.2% were non-families. 33.7% of all households were made up of individuals, and 15.4% had someone living alone who was 65 years of age or older. The average household size was 2.03 and the average family size was 2.55.

In the CDP, the population was spread out, with 14.9% under the age of 18, 4.6% from 18 to 24, 24.3% from 25 to 44, 29.3% from 45 to 64, and 26.8% who were 65 years of age or older. The median age was 50 years. For every 100 females, there were 96.2 males. For every 100 females age 18 and over, there were 91.6 males.

The median income for a household in the CDP was $42,300, and the median income for a family was $56,250. Males had a median income of $39,554 versus $37,344 for females. The per capita income for the CDP was $26,468. About 5.8% of families and 8.1% of the population were below the poverty line, including 18.8% of those under age 18 and none of those age 65 or over.
