= Chatham Island (disambiguation) =

Chatham Island is the largest island in New Zealand's Chatham Islands group.

Chatham Island(s) may also refer to:

Australia

- Chatham Island (Western Australia), in the Great Southern region

Canada

- Chatham Islands (British Columbia)

Chile

- Chatham Island, Chile

Ecuador

- A former name for San Cristóbal Island, Galapagos, Ecuador

India

- Chatham Island (Andaman), part of the Andaman chain

New Zealand

- Chatham Islands, New Zealand, in the Pacific Ocean (local names Rekohu and Wharekauri)

== See also ==
- Chatham (disambiguation)
