= Monomoy Shoals =

Coordinates: 41°35′11″N 69°55′12″W

Monomoy Shoals is a set of shoals (shallow, sandy ocean bottom) off Monomoy Point (which is in Chatham, Massachusetts on Cape Cod). It lies in the Atlantic Ocean just outside Nantucket Sound.

Constituent named shoals include:

- Bearse Shoal
- Handkerchief Shoal
- Little Round Shoal
- Stonehorse Shoal
