= Wilderness Foundation UK =

The Wilderness Foundation UK is a British charity focused on promoting environmental conservation and environmental education. It operates initiatives such as community allotments, school visits, extra-curricular programs, and nature therapy. The charity collaborates with vulnerable young people and adults, bringing thousands of people into contact with nature each year. It is part of Wilderness Foundation Global, a group of organisations that does similar conservation work in different parts of the world.

One of the seven charities nominated by Prince Harry and Meghan Markle to receive donations in lieu of wedding presents when the couple married on 19 May 2018, Prince Harry visited the charity's headquarters at Chatham Green, near Chelmsford, Essex, a year earlier in 2017 when he engaged with students during a survival course.
