= Monomoy National Wildlife Refuge =

Conservation area in Massachusetts, United States

Monomoy Island National Wildlife Refuge
- IUCN category IV (habitat/species management area)
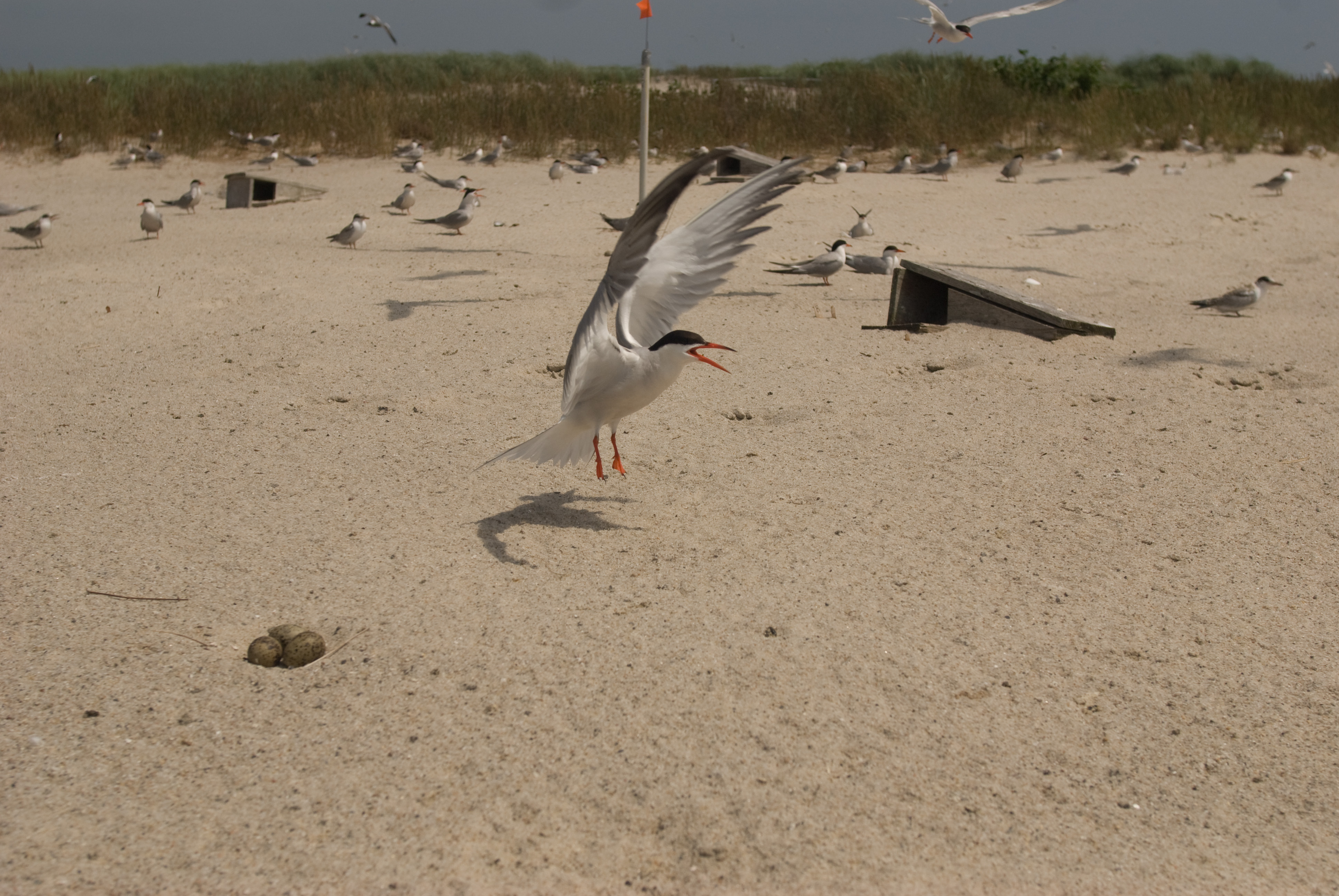
- Tern at Monomoy

- Location within Cape Cod Location within Massachusetts Location within the United States
- Location: Barnstable County, Massachusetts, United States
- Nearest city: Chatham, Massachusetts
- Coordinates: 41°33′0″N 70°0′0″W
- Area: 7,604 acres (30.77 km^{2})
- Established: 1944
- Governing body: U.S. Fish and Wildlife Service
- Website: Monomoy National Wildlife Refuge

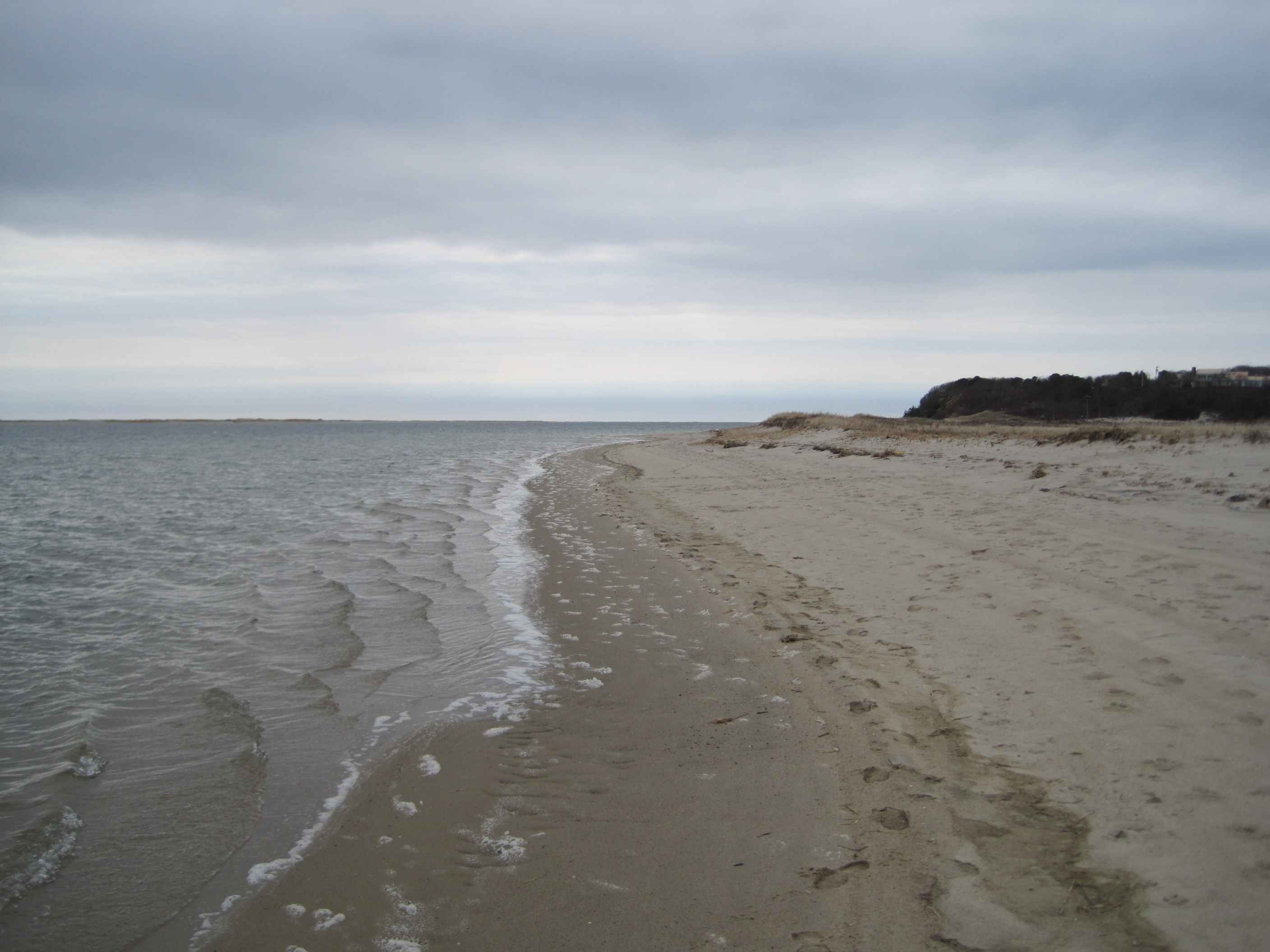
Beach at the refuge

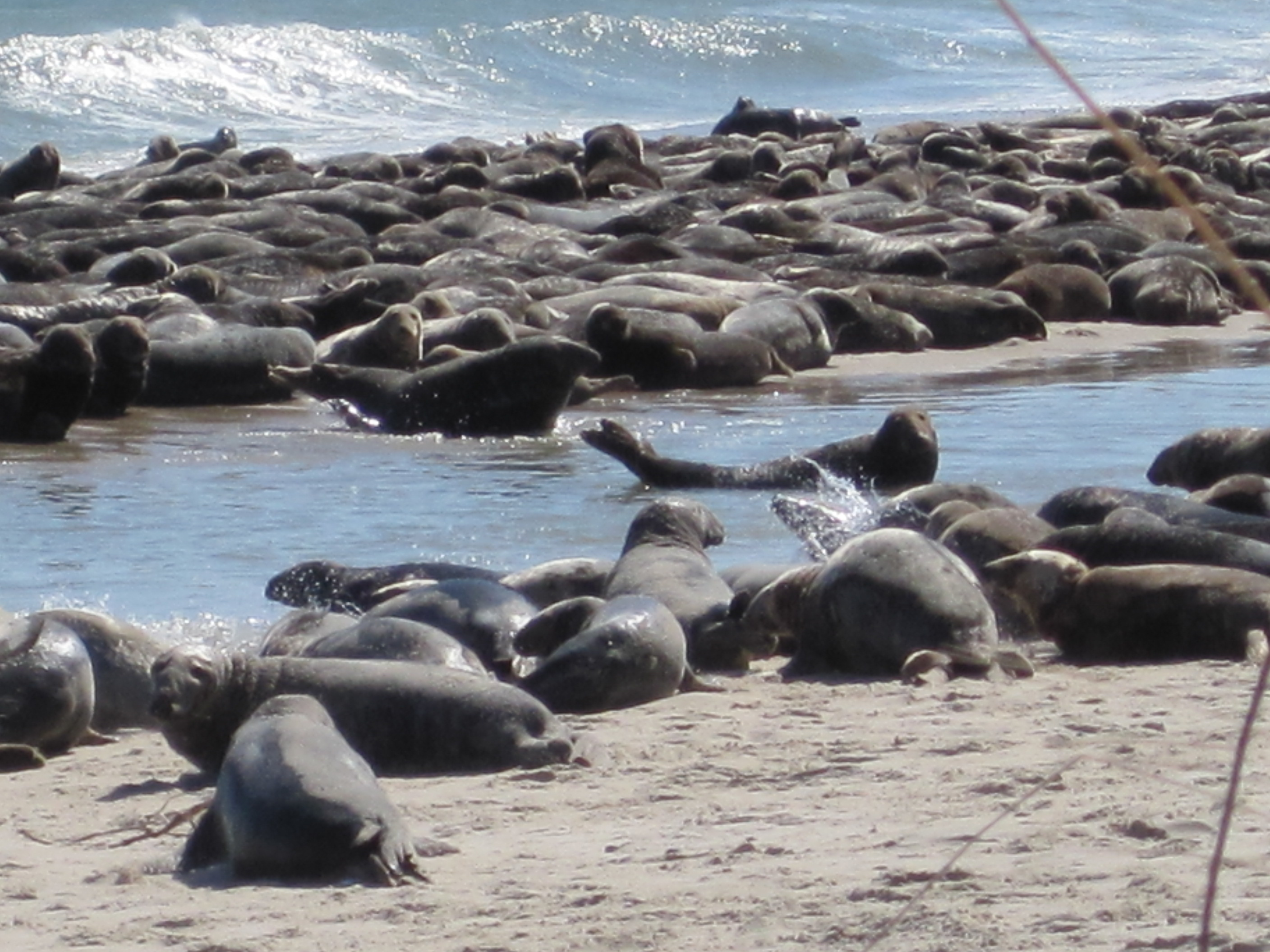
Grey seals at the refuge

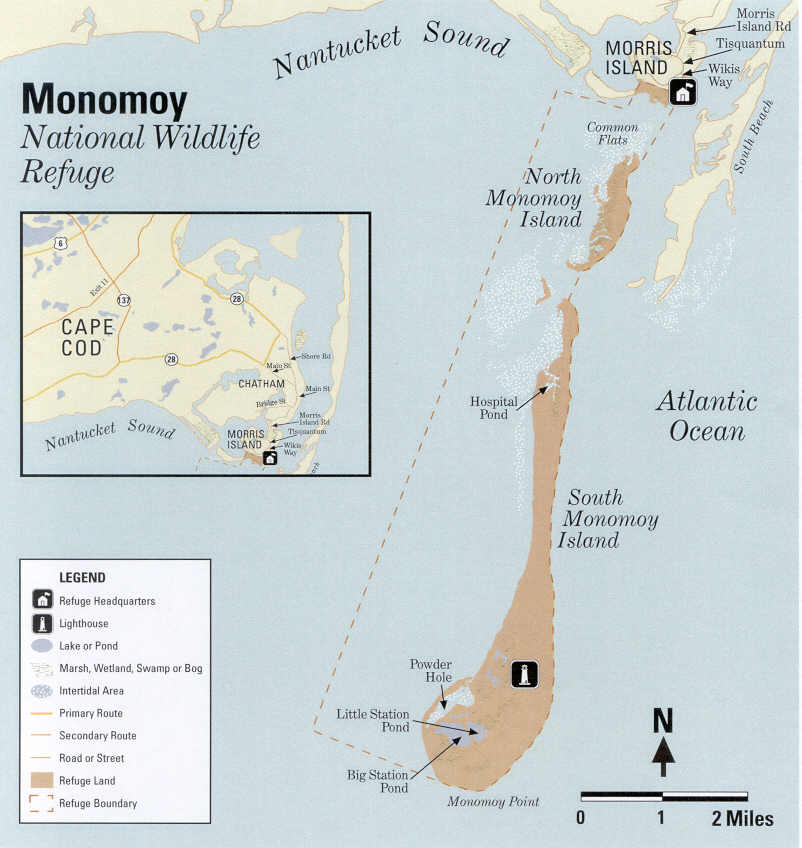
Map of Monomoy National Wildlife Refuge area

Monomoy Island National Wildlife Refuge is a federal national wildlife refuge within the National Wildlife Refuge System in the United States. Monomoy NWR consists of 3 offshore barrier islands stretching south off of Chatham, Massachusetts: North Monomoy, South Monomoy, and Minimoy islands, as well as a parcel of land on the mainland called the Morris Island unit.

Monomoy island was taken over by the US government just before World War II and established as a National Wildlife Refuge in 1944. The island was also home to the Monomoy Island Gunnery Range from 1944 until 1951. The refuge's goal is to provide habitat for migratory birds. The size of the refuge is 7,604 acres (31 km^{2}) with varied habitats of oceans, salt and freshwater marshes, dunes, freshwater ponds, and some historic manmade structures, such as the Monomoy Point Light and keeper's quarters (decommissioned). Part of the refuge includes the Monomoy Wilderness.

The visitor center and staff offices are located at 791 Main Street in Chatham, and are open on a limited basis depending on volunteer availability.

Walking trails at the Morris Island unit can be accessed year round from the parking lot at 30 Wikis Way in Chatham. In the summer (Memorial Day to Labor Day), the Friends of Monomoy NWR staff an information kiosk at the end of Wikis Way. The kiosk is generally staffed from 10AM - 4PM, but hours may vary.

Access to North Monomoy, South Monomoy, and Minimoy Island is by boat only. The Service does not operate public boat access to the offshore islands. Local operators with Special Use Permits issued by the Refuge provide access. These islands contain sensitive ecosystems, and provide critically important habitat for threatened shorebirds.
