= Veterans Field (Massachusetts) =

Baseball venue in Chatham, Massachusetts, United States

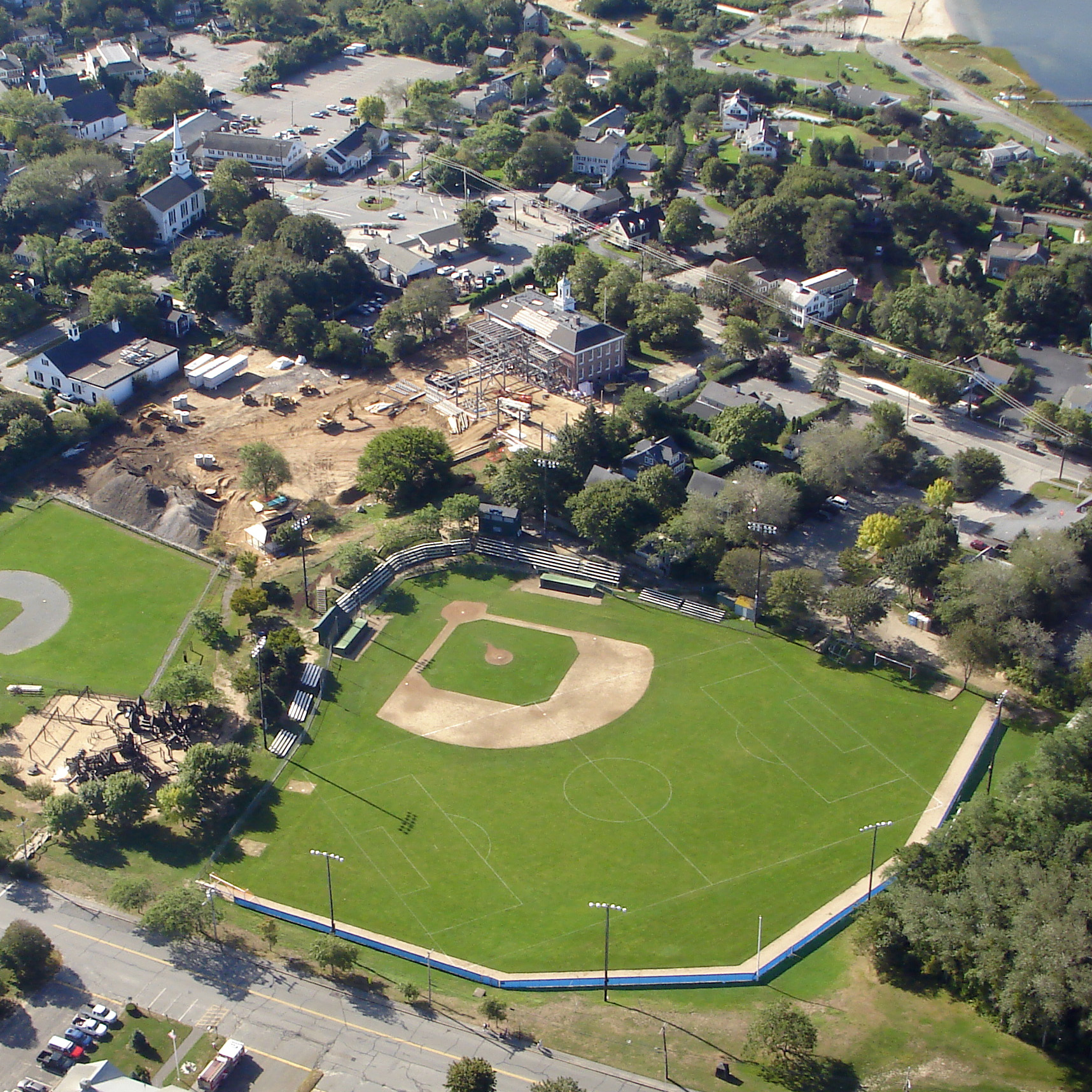
- Interactive map of Veterans Field
- Address: 1 Veterans Field Road
- Location: Chatham, Massachusetts, U.S.
- Coordinates: 41.684579°N 69.9626°W
- Capacity: 8,000
- Surface: Grass
- Field size: Left field: 325 ft (99 m); Center field: 385 ft (117 m); Right field: 314 ft (96 m)

Construction
- Opened: 1927

Tenant
- Chatham Anglers (CCBL)

Veterans Field is a baseball venue in Chatham, Massachusetts, home to the Chatham Anglers of the Cape Cod Baseball League (CCBL). The ballpark is located in downtown Chatham along Massachusetts Route 28.

== Description ==
Nestled within a natural bowl of embankments that provides ample spectator vantage points, Veterans Field has been called a "panorama of beauty," and "a portrait right out of Yankee Magazine." The ballpark features a large adjacent playground, and draws from the bustling foot traffic of nearby main street shops. The grassy right field hillside seats fans on blankets and beach chairs, and is topped by the quaint backdrop of the town's fire house and the former rail station that is now the Chatham Railroad Museum. The infield was the location of the town's first high school, constructed in 1858. With the construction of the consolidated school (now a community center) in 1924, the high school was moved the several hundred feet and grafted onto the new building, thus clearing the way for Veterans Field to be built. Surrounded on three sides by the sea, the town's geographic location frequently produces "fog delays" during evening ball games, an oddity that has come to be seen as symbolic of the unique flavor of baseball in Chatham.

== History ==
A charter member of the original four-team Cape Cod Baseball League (CCBL) that began play in 1923, Chatham quickly got to work constructing a field that would host its town baseball team and other town events. In 1925, the plot of land for Veterans Field was acquired, and its name was settled upon "as a memorial to those from Chatham who served in the World War and all other wars." By the early spring of 1927, final grading of the field was being completed, and that season both the Chatham High School baseball team as well as the Chatham CCBL franchise began play at the park.

Various improvements to Veterans Field have taken place since its original construction. A 2008 grant from the Yawkey Foundation provided the impetus for significant upgrades to the lighting and outfield playing surface, as well as the installation of a brick backstop and protective netting.

== Events ==
In 1984, Veterans Field hosted a contest between the CCBL all-stars and the United States national baseball team, which was touring in preparation for the 1984 Summer Olympics in Los Angeles. Veterans Field again hosted a CCBL–Team USA matchup in 2000, as the national team prepared for the 2000 Summer Olympics in Sydney, Australia. The 2000 event drew a reported 10,000 fans, the largest crowd to date ever to witness a sporting event on Cape Cod.

Veterans Field hosted the CCBL's annual all-star game festivities in 1964, 1968, 1971, 1998, 2008, and 2016, and has seen Chatham claim CCBL championships in 1967, 1982, 1992, 1996, and 1998. The ballpark has been the summertime home of dozens of future major leaguers such as Thurman Munson, Jeff Bagwell, and Kris Bryant.

=== Other uses ===
The 2001 Hollywood romantic comedy Summer Catch was set in Chatham, and used Veterans Field in its portrayal of the Cape Cod Baseball League.
