= Chatham Windmill =

Historic windmill in Massachusetts, US

- U.S. National Register of Historic Places
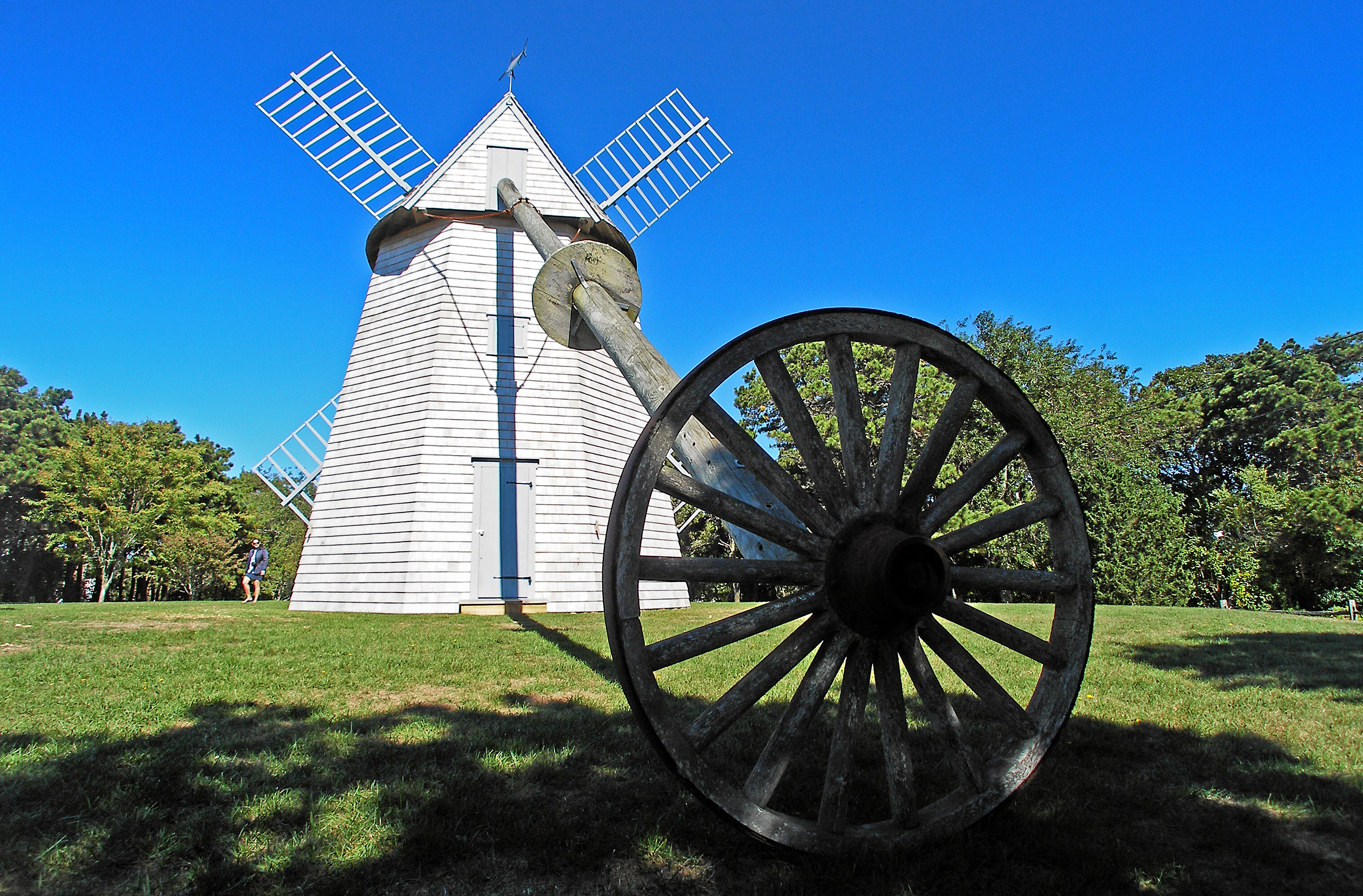

- Location within Cape Cod Location within Massachusetts Location within the United States
- Location: Chase Park, Chatham, Massachusetts
- Coordinates: 41°40′34″N 69°57′33″W
- Area: less than one acre
- Built: 1797
- Architect: Benjamin Godfrey
- NRHP reference No.: 78000421
- Added to NRHP: November 30, 1978

The Chatham Windmill is a historic windmill at Chase Park in Chatham, Massachusetts. Built in 1797, it is one of the state's few surviving wooden windmills, and also one of the few still in working condition. The windmill was listed on the National Register of Historic Places in 1978.

== Description and history ==
The Chatham Windmill is located southwest of downtown Chatham, in the southern section of Chase Park, between Shattuck and Gristmill Lanes. It is a wood-frame structure, set on a rise overlooking the Mill Pond on Chatham's south shore. It is about three stories in height, with an octagonal shape that tapers to a gabled cap and is covered in wooden shingles. The cap's side faces are slightly bowed. The wind vanes are attached to one of the gabled ends of the cap. Entrances are located at the northern and southern sides of the structures, and there are small windows on the second level.

The mill was built in 1797 by Benjamin Godfrey and was used to grind corn. It was originally located on Stage Harbor Road and was moved to its present location in 1955, the year it was given to the town. The methods used in its construction suggest that the builder was from the southeast of England. The mill remained in commercial use until 1907 when it was significantly damaged in a storm. Although it was repaired, it was again damaged by severe weather in 1929. The mill has undergone several phases of rehabilitation, during which worn and rotted parts have been replaced.

The mill is operated seasonally as a museum, and the town employs a miller to occasionally use it to grind grain.

== See also ==
- National Register of Historic Places listings in Barnstable County, Massachusetts
