= Monomoy Point Light =

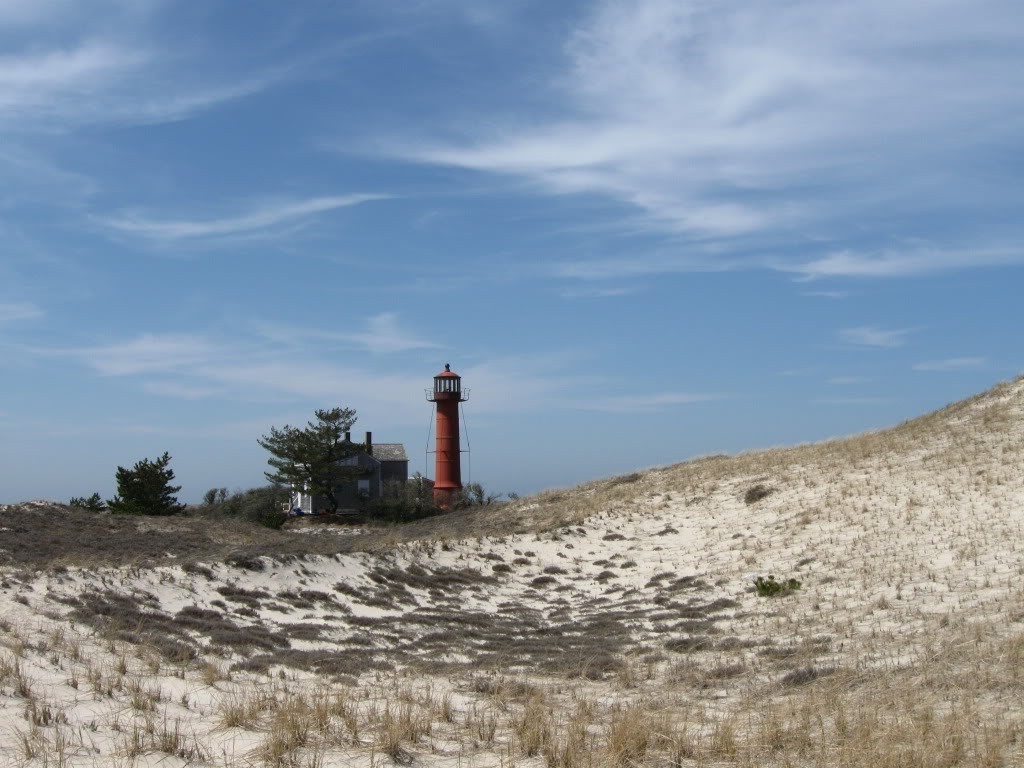
- Monomoy Point Light in 2010
- Location: Monomoy Island
- Coordinates: 41°33′33.6″N 69°59′37.4″W

Tower
- Constructed: 1823
- Foundation: Brick
- Construction: Cast iron with brick lining
- Automated: no
- Height: 14 m (46 ft)
- Shape: Cylindrical
- Markings: Red with black lantern
- Heritage: National Register of Historic Places listed place

Light
- First lit: 1849 (current structure)
- Deactivated: 1923
- Lens: Fourth order Fresnel Lens
- Monomoy Point Lighthouse
- U.S. National Register of Historic Places
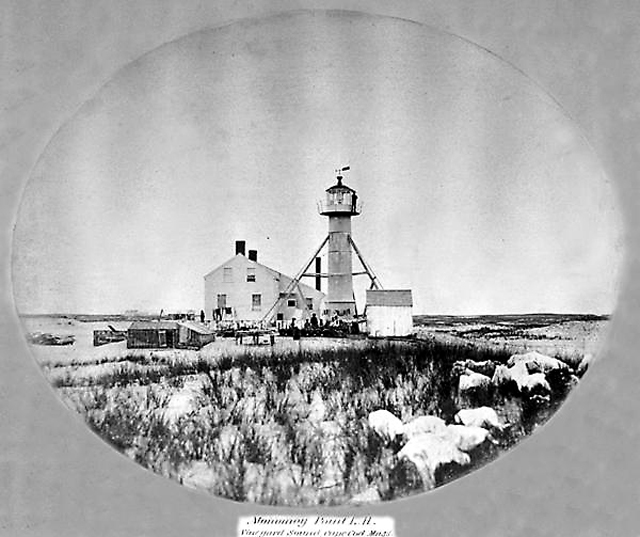
- Monomoy Lighthouse circa 1865
- Nearest city: Chatham, Massachusetts
- Area: 4 acres (1.6 ha)
- Built: 1849
- Architectural style: Cape Cod
- MPS: Lighthouses of Massachusetts TR (AD)
- NRHP reference No.: 79000324
- Added to NRHP: November 01, 1979

Monomoy Point Light is a historic light in Chatham, Massachusetts.

The station was established in 1823. The first light was a wood tower and brick lantern room on top of the keeper's house. The current tower, one of the first made of cast iron, was built in 1849.

After the opening of the Cape Cod Canal in 1914, most vessels bound from south of the Cape to the Boston area took the shorter and safer route through the canal, so there was much less traffic past the light and the light was deactivated in 1923.

It was added to the National Register of Historic Places as Monomoy Point Lighthouse on November 1, 1979, reference number 79000324.

The keeper's house is preserved and serves today as a base for wildlife management efforts. The Lighthouse Preservation Society, the Massachusetts Audubon Society, and The Friends of Monomoy have supported the past efforts in preservation of the lighthouse and keeper's house. It lies within the Monomoy Wilderness as part of Monomoy National Wildlife Refuge.

While the inside of lighthouse and the keeper's house are not open to the public, there is public access to and from the shoreline. The house is supposedly haunted, with several claims of seeing a light inside the house after dark from passing boats. The trail that leads to the lighthouse and the keeper's house is only accessible by boat.

== See also ==
- National Register of Historic Places listings in Barnstable County, Massachusetts
