= North Chatham, Massachusetts =

- Census-designated place
- Location of the Town of Chatham in the state of Massachusetts.
- Coordinates: 41°42′05″N 69°57′13″W
- Country: United States
- State: Massachusetts
- County: Barnstable
- Town: Chatham
- Elevation: 39 ft (12 m)
- Time zone: UTC-5 (Eastern (EST))
  - Summer (DST): UTC-4 (EDT)
- Area code: 508
- GNIS feature ID: 615967

North Chatham is a census-designated place (CDP) in the town of Chatham in Barnstable County, Massachusetts, United States.
