= Chatham (surname) =

Chatham is a surname. Notable people with the surname include:

- C. J. Chatham (born 1994), American baseball player
- Charles Chatham (1910–1994), English cricketer
- Gerald Chatham (1906–1956), American lawyer, lead prosecutor in the Emmett Till case
- John Chatham (Australian politician) (1866–1925)
- John Purnell Chatham (1872–1914), American sailor and Medal of Honor recipient
- Ray Chatham (1924–1999), English footballer
- Rhys Chatham (born 1952), American musician
- Richard Thurmond Chatham (1896–1957), American politician
- Russell Chatham (1939–2019), American landscape artist
- William Chatham (1859–1941), Scottish-born engineer and government official of Hong Kong
