= HMS Chatham =

Fifteen ships of the Royal Navy have been named HMS Chatham after the port of Chatham, Kent, home of the Chatham Dockyard.

- HMS Chatham (1666) was a galliot captured in 1666 during the Second Anglo-Dutch War and given away in 1667.
- HMS Chatham (1673) was a 4-gun sloop launched in 1673 and wrecked in 1677.
- HMS Chatham (1691) was a fourth rate launched in 1691 and sunk as a breakwater at Sheerness in 1749. She was raised and broken up in 1762.
- HMS Chatham (1716) was a 4-gun yacht launched in 1716 and sold in 1742.
- HMS Chatham (1741) was a 6-gun yacht launched in 1741. She was rebuilt in 1793 and 1842, and broken up by 1867.
- HMS Chatham (1758) was a 50-gun fourth rate launched in 1758. She was used for harbour service from 1793 and was a powder hulk from 1805. She was renamed HMS Tilbury in 1810 and was broken up in 1814.
- HMS Chatham (1788) was a 4-gun survey brig, launched in 1788. She was part of George Vancouver's expedition of the Pacific Northwest coast and circumnavigated the globe. She was sold in 1830.
- HMS Chatham (1790) was a 4-gun schooner purchased in 1790 and sold in 1794.
- HMS Chatham (1793) was a hired sloop in service in 1793.
- HMS Chatham (1811) was a transport launched in 1811 and sunk as a breakwater in 1825.
- HMS Chatham (1812) was a 74-gun third rate, originally the French Royal Hollandais. She was captured on the stocks in 1809 at Flushing, launched in 1812, and sold in 1817.
- HMS Chatham (1813) was a sheer hulk launched in 1813 and broken up in 1876.
- HMS Chatham (1835) was an iron paddlewheel gunboat launched in 1835. She was subsequently exported to the United States and became a blockade runner for the Confederate Navy during the American Civil War. She was captured by USS Huron in 1863 and became USS Chatham. She served with the US Navy until 1865.
- HMS Chatham (1911) was a Town-class light cruiser launched in 1911. She was lent to the Royal New Zealand Navy in 1920 and was scrapped in 1926.
- HMS Chatham (F87) was a Type 22 frigate. She was launched in 1988 and decommissioned in February 2011.

== See also ==
- HMS Chatham Double
- HMS Chatham Hulk
- HMS Chatham Prize
