= Slut's Bush =

Former island in Barnstable County, Massachusetts, United States

Coordinates: 41.6875°N 69.9382°W

Slut's Bush was an island off the coast of Chatham, Massachusetts.

Once a rocky, swampy island covered with low shrubs, berry bushes, and vines, it appeared on 17th century maps of Cape Cod, as well as 18th century deeds of the area. It may have been a small portion of a larger island referred to as 'Ile Nawset' or Nauset Island.

By 1864 it was described as under deep water, although stumps and roots could still be seen from a boat on a calm day.
