= USS Chatham =

USS Chatham is a name used more than once by the US Navy:

- USS Chatham, an iron side wheel steamer, built in 1836.
- USS Chatham (ID-2510), launched in 1916 by Maryland Steel Company, Sparrows Point, Maryland.
- USS Chatham (CVE-32), transferred to the United Kingdom on 11 August 1943 under Lend-Lease and renamed HMS Slinger.
- USS Chatham (AK-169), launched 13 May 1944 by Froemming Brothers, Milwaukee, Wisconsin.
