= Chatham High School =

Chatham High School may refer to:

== United States ==
- Glenwood High School (Illinois), Chatham, Illinois — sometimes labeled "Chatham (Glenwood)" in sports, and successor to Chatham High School
- Chatham High School, Chatham, Louisiana
- Chatham High School (Massachusetts), Chatham, Massachusetts
- Chatham High School (New Jersey), Chatham, New Jersey
- Chatham Borough High School, a former high school in Chatham Borough, New Jersey
- Chatham Township High School, a former high school in Chatham Township, New Jersey
- Chatham High School (New York), Chatham, New York
- Chatham Central High School, Bear Creek, North Carolina
- Cheatham County Central High School, Ashland City, Tennessee
- Chatham High School (Virginia), Chatham, Virginia

== Australia ==
- Chatham High School (New South Wales), Taree, New South Wales
