= Archelaus Smith =

- Born: April 23, 1734; Chatham, Province of Massachusetts
- Died: April 3, 1821 (aged 86); Centreville, Cape Sable Island, Nova Scotia
- Known for: Early settler of Barrington, Nova Scotia
- Spouse: Elizabeth Nickerson
- Children: Susanna Smith, Hezekiah Smith, Mercy Smith, Eunice Smith, James Smith, Stephen Smith, Archelaus Smith, Jr., Hannah Smith

Archelaus Smith (23 April 1734 - 3 April 1821), was a tanner, fisherman, surveyor, and early settler of Barrington, Nova Scotia. He was born in Chatham, Province of Massachusetts to parents Deacon Stephen Smith (c.1706-1766) and Bathsheba (Brown) Smith (1709–1766). He was christened in the Congregational Church, Chatham on 23 Apr 1734. At eighteen years of age he married Elizabeth Nickerson (1735–1828), daughter of William Nickerson (1701–1763) and Sarah (Covell) Nickerson (c.1706-b.1790), in Chatham, in a ceremony performed by the Reverend Stephen Emery. They had eight children (four boys and four girls).

== Origins ==
In the spring of 1760 Smith began planning to move his family from their home in Chatham to a new home in Barrington, Nova Scotia. His family, along with that of Thomas Crowell, were the first permanent English-speaking settlers in the area. Archelaus spent the summer of 1760 fishing, and during that time determined that Native hostility in the Barrington area was too threatening, and changed his mind about moving. However, his wife Elizabeth was unaware of his change of heart, and took it upon herself to travel to Barrington with her family before her husband returned to Chatham. It is possible that they crossed paths, but certainly he was delayed in returning to Barrington. When he finally got there, he found his family being cared for by friendly natives, the same people he had feared.

== Original proprietor ==
Smith was one of the original proprietors in the area, settling at Barrington Head in the fall of 1760. In 1773 he moved to Cape Sable Island, where he and his family eventually occupied almost all the land from Northeast Point to West Head (a distance of five miles). He also held a tract of land at Lower Clark's Harbour, a large part of The Hawk Point, and a great meadow in the centre of the island. He built a home near the shore, a little north of where the Centreville Baptist Church would later stand.

== Character ==
Smith had a fair education, and was highly respected by other settlers. He was known as a "good, quiet, easy, patient man", and was chosen over several years to be clerk of the proprietors, as well as a community magistrate and a surveyor. By trade he was a tanner and a shoemaker, using lime made from mussel shells to cure leather. Before a minister came to the island he conducted religious services for the community, including marriage ceremonies and funeral services.

== Death ==
Smith died 3 April 1821 in Centreville, Cape Sable Island, Nova Scotia. His burial site is unknown, but a monument to his memory was placed in the Centreville Cemetery in the late 1800s. In addition, the local historical society (and the museum they maintain in Centreville) bear his name.
