= Chatham Seaplane Base =

Seaplane base in Alaska, United States

- IATA: CYM; ICAO: none; FAA LID: 05AA

Summary
- Airport type: Public use
- Owner: Chatham Cannery Ltd.
- Serves: Chatham, Alaska
- Elevation AMSL: 0 ft (0 m)
- Coordinates: 57°30′54″N 134°56′46″W

Map
- Location of airport in Alaska

Runways
Direction	Length		Surface
Direction	ft	m	Surface
NW/SE	10,000	3,048	Water

Statistics (2015)
- Based aircraft: 0
- Passengers: 15
- Freight: 1,547 lbs
- Source: Federal Aviation Administration

Chatham Seaplane Base (IATA: CYM, FAA LID: 05AA) is a privately owned, public use seaplane base located in Chatham in the U.S. state of Alaska. Chatham lies within the limits of the City and Borough of Sitka, Alaska (near its northeast corner).

== Facilities and aircraft ==
Chatham Seaplane Base has one seaplane landing area designated NW/SE with a water surface measuring 10,000 by 1,000 feet (3,048 x 305 m). For the 12-month period ending December 31, 2006, the airport had 85 aircraft operations, an average of 7 per month: 94% air taxi and 6% general aviation.

=== Statistics ===
Carrier shares: January – December 2015
Carrier	Passengers (arriving and departing)
Ward Air	20(100.00%)

Top domestic destinations: January – December 2015
Rank	City	Airport	Passengers
1	(Alaska) Juneau, AK	Juneau International Airport	4

== See also ==
- List of airports in Alaska

== Other sources ==
- Essential Air Service documents (Docket DOT-OST-1997-3134) from the U.S. Department of Transportation:
  - Order 2004-7-21 (July 22, 2004): re-selects Ward Air, Inc. to provide essential air service at Chatham and Funter Bay, Alaska, for the period December 1, 2003 through September 30, 2006, at an annual subsidy of $12,865.
  - Order 2006-9-16 (September 18, 2006): re-selecting Ward Air, Inc., to continue to provide subsidized essential air service (EAS) at Chatham and Funter Bay, Alaska, and setting an annual subsidy rate of $15,040 for a new two-year term beginning October 1, 2006, through September 30, 2008.
  - Order 2008-6-27 (June 19, 2008): re-selecting Ward Air, Inc., to provide subsidized essential air service (EAS) at the communities of Chatham and Funter Bay, Alaska, for the two-year period beginning October 1, 2008, at an annual subsidy of $17,280 with 3-seat Cessna C-185, 4-seat Cessna C-206, or 6-seat DeHavilland DHC-2 Beaver single-engine, amphib-float equipped aircraft.
  - Order 2010-7-11 (July 15, 2010): re-selecting Ward Air, Inc., to provide essential air service (EAS) at Chatham and Funter Bay, Alaska, at annual subsidy rates of $6,311 at Chatham and $13,273 at Funter Bay, from October 1, 2010, through September 30, 2012.
  - Order 2012-9-2 (September 4, 2012): re-selecting Ward Air, Inc., to provide Essential Air Service (EAS) at Chatham and Funter Bay, Alaska, at annual subsidies of $11,040 at Chatham and $12,896 at Funter Bay, from October 1, 2012, through September 30, 2013; and $11,472 at Chatham and $13,416 at Funter Bay, from October 1, 2013, through September 30, 2014.
