= Charles Chatham =

English cricketer

Charles Henry Chatham (18 June 1910 – 24 February 1994) was an English cricketer: a right-handed batsman and right arm medium-pace bowler who played a single first-class match, for Worcestershire against Oxford University at The Parks in May 1934. He made 8 and 4, and took 1-49, his only first-class wicket being that of Edward Moss.

He was born in Tewkesbury, Gloucestershire, and died at the age of 83 in Cheltenham.
