= USS Monomoy =

WWII U.S. Navy ship and later U.S. Coast Guard ship

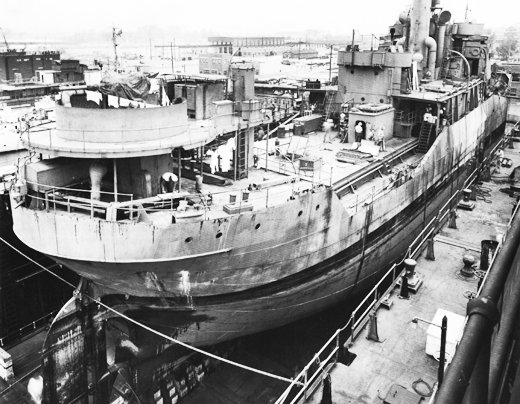
- USS Monomoy (AG-40)

History

United States
- Name: USS Monomoy
- Namesake: A point and island south of the town of Chatham on Cape Cod between Nantucket Sound and the Atlantic Ocean
- Owner: 1918:United States Shipping Board; before 1941:Steel Products Transportation Company, Buffalo, New York
- Builder: Globe Shipbuilding Company, Duluth, Minnesota
- Yard number: 104
- Launched: 29 August 1918 as Lake Arline
- Completed: October 1918
- Acquired: 15 September 1941 as J. Floyd Massey, Jr.
- Commissioned: 24 December 1941 as USS Monomoy (AG-40)
- Recommissioned: as USCGC Monomoy (WPC-275)
- Decommissioned: 22 October 1943
- Renamed: Monomoy, 15 October 1941
- Stricken: 30 October 1943
- Fate: Scrapped, 1951

General characteristics
- Type: commercial cargo ship
- Displacement: 2,580 tons
- Length: 261 ft (80 m)
- Beam: 43 ft 6 in (13.26 m)
- Draft: 18 ft (5.5 m)
- Installed power: triple expansion reciprocating steam engine
- Propulsion: 1,200 shp (890 kW) single shaft
- Speed: 10 knots (19 km/h; 12 mph)
- Complement: 70 officers and enlisted
- Armament: 1 × 4 in (100 mm) single gun mount; 4 × 0.5 in (12.7 mm) machine guns; 2 × depth charge projectors

USS Monomoy (AG-40) was a commercial cargo ship acquired by the U.S. Navy during World War II. She was outfitted with guns and depth charges and sent into the dangerous waters of the North Atlantic Ocean to furnish data used to predict storm movement and severe weather conditions to safeguard the continuous movement of merchant convoys, naval warships, and airplanes between North America and the United Kingdom, Murmansk, and other destinations. She served as an escort vessel when required. She was crewed by the U.S. Coast Guard and was eventually transferred to that agency as USCGC Monomoy (WAG-275).

== Built in Duluth, Minnesota ==
Monomoy (AG-40) was built in 1918 by Globe Shipbuilding Co., Duluth, Minnesota; acquired as J. Floyd Massey, Jr 15 September 1941 from Steel Products Transportation Company, Buffalo, New York; renamed Monomoy 15 October 1941; and commissioned 24 December 1941.

== World War II Navy service ==
Monomoy, crewed and operated by the U.S. Coast Guard, joined the Weather Patrol, U.S. Atlantic Fleet, in 1942. From her base at Boston, Massachusetts, she periodically sailed to weather stations 1 and 2, where she provided weather reports vital for the safety of convoys and air commerce.

Operating in dangerous waters, she made frequent contact with enemy submarines. At 9:07 PM on 24 July 1942 after spotting wake from two torpedoes crossing ten yards off the bow, the Officer of the Deck (Albert L. Preston) spotted a U-Boat periscope and conning tower. Four shots were fired from the 4" gun at 9:09 PM. The second, targeted at 2,000 yards, resulted in a metallic thud and a fire at the location of the U-Boat, which then disappeared from view. Two more shots were fired, followed by depth charges. No survivors were seen.

She continued patrolling the North Atlantic, the North Sea, and the Bay of Biscay for the next 15 months. At times it took two men to control the ship's wheel in the rough seas. The ship rendered valuable service to Allied ships and planes in the North Atlantic.

== Transferred to the Coast Guard ==
She was formally transferred to the Coast Guard 22 October 1943, and stricken from the Naval Register 30 October. Redesignated WAG-275, Monomoy served the Coast Guard through the remainder of the war and was then transferred to the U.S. Maritime Commission. She was scrapped in 1951.
