= The Chatham =

Former bar in Monte Carlo, Monaco

The Chatham, popularly known as "Rosie's Bar" or just "Rosie's", was a bar on the Avenue d'Ostende in Monaco's Monte Carlo district run by Rosie Bernard. Opened by Bernard's father in 1946, the bar was popular with motor racing personalities and hydrographers. It closed due to redevelopment in 1996.

== History ==
The bar was located near the Beau Rivage corner on the Circuit de Monaco. It was opened by Bernard's father in 1946 and named for the Chatham Dockyard of the British Royal Navy to appeal to the many British Naval personnel who visited the port or Monaco.

The bar was decorated with photographs, newspaper clippings, and memorabilia associated with motor racing. The official Formula One 'opus' book described the bar as "Not the biggest, certainly not the most luxurious nor even the best of the Principality's many watering holes ... It was one of the temples of grand prix racing".

The bar was popular with motor racing personalities and hydrographers. In his autobiography, Graham, Graham Hill wrote that he always called at Rosie's for "a quick beer" before leaving Monaco after a race weekend. Bernard remembered Hill visiting with his family on many occasions; his son Damon visited the bar after retiring from the 1996 Monaco Grand Prix. Graham Hill had first visited Rosie's with his fellow Naval personnel during his time serving on HMS Swiftsure.

In 1994, the Canadian hydrographers Rob Hare and Peter Kielland were in Monaco for the International Hydrographic Organization; the pair went to the bar to check that graffiti left by Canadian hydrographers was still there. Lighthouse, the journal of the Canadian Hydrographers' Association, described Rosie's bar as a "real hydrographers bar".

In 1969, the location of the bar was moved by 100 metres (330 ft) as a result of redevelopment. The bar closed in 1996. Following the closure, Bernard ran a souvenir boutique on the Rue Comte Félix Gastaldi in Monaco Ville.

Bernard published her memories of the bar, Rosie's Memories, in 2007. Finally it was bought and rescued by Trevor Baines and became part of Café Grand prix, now centered on the Rascasse.
