= Chatham County =

Chatham County may refer to:

- Chatham County, Georgia
- Chatham County, North Carolina
