= Chatham, Florida =

- Unincorporated community
- Location within Florida Location within the United States
- Coordinates: 25.714°N 81.244°W
- Country: United States
- State: Florida
- County: Monroe
- Elevation: 0 ft (0 m)
- Time zone: UTC-5 (Eastern (EST))
  - Summer (DST): UTC-4 (EDT)

Chatham is an unincorporated community in Monroe County, Florida, United States, located in the Everglades National Park, approximately 10 miles (16 km) southeast of Everglades City.

== Geography ==
Chatham is located at 25.714°N 81.244°W, at an elevation of 0 feet (0 m).
