= Chatham, Alaska =

Neighborhood of Sitka, Alaska

Coordinates: 57°30′55″N 134°56′37″W

Chatham is a neighborhood of Sitka, Alaska. Even though it is within the cities boundaries, Chatham is not actually located within the town itself. It was named for the Chatham Strait. Established in 1905, it was originally a cannery village.
