= Chatham High School (Massachusetts) =

Public school in Massachusetts, US

Coordinates: 41.6946°N 69.9708°W

Chatham High School was a public high school located in Chatham, Massachusetts. Chatham served roughly 250 students in grades 9–12. Chatham's mascot was the Blue Devils and the school's colors were Royal Blue and White. In September 2014, Chatham merged with Harwich High School of Harwich to become the new Monomoy Regional High School.
