= Chatham Green =

Hamlet in Essex, England

Coordinates: 51.810°N 0.487°E

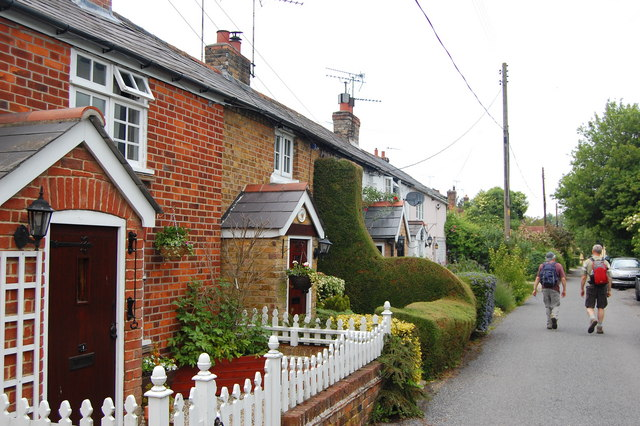
- Grade II listed cottages in Chatham Green

- Location within Essex
- Civil parish: Little Waltham
- District: Chelmsford
- Shire county: Essex
- Region: East
- Country: England
- Sovereign state: United Kingdom
- Police: Essex
- Fire: Essex
- Ambulance: East of England

Chatham Green is a hamlet in the civil parish of Little Waltham and the Chelmsford district of Essex, England. The hamlet is 1.5 miles (2.4 km) north from Little Waltham village, and approximately 4 miles (6 km) north from the county town of Chelmsford. Chatham Green is adjacent to the A131 road, which runs to the A130, combined being the road from Braintree to Chelmsford.

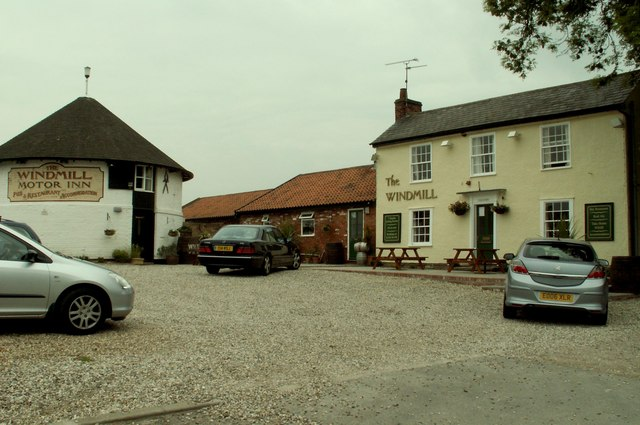
The Windmill pub at Chatham Green

Chatham Green's public house and restaurant is The Windmill.

Within the hamlet are twelve Grade II listed houses and cottages. Chatham was recorded in the Domesday Book of 1086 as Cetham.
