= USS Chatham (1836) =

American Civil War-era steamship

History

United States
- Name: USS Chatham
- Builder: John Laird, Sons & Co
- Laid down: date unknown
- Launched: 1836
- Commissioned: 22 June 1864
- Decommissioned: April 1865
- Stricken: 1865 (est.)
- Home port: Port Royal, South Carolina
- Captured: By Union Navy forces; 16 December 1863
- Fate: Sold, 2 September 1865

General characteristics
- Type: Steamer
- Displacement: 198 long tons (201 t)
- Length: 120 ft (37 m)
- Beam: 26 ft (7.9 m)
- Draft: 7 ft 7 in (2.31 m)
- Propulsion: Steam engine; Side-wheel propelled
- Speed: Unknown
- Complement: Unknown
- Armament: Unknown
- Armor: Iron

USS Chatham was a Confederate side-wheel steamer captured by the Union Navy during the American Civil War. She was used by the Union Navy as a harbor ship, used to transport military personnel, dispatches, and supplies to and from ships anchored in the harbor.

== Confederate service ==
Chatham — an iron side-wheel steamer — was built in 1836 by John Laird, Birkenhead, England for export to Savannah, Georgia, knocked-down. Assembled in Savannah, she was used as a river steamer until the American Civil War when she became a blockade runner. She was captured by USS Huron while attempting to run the blockade on 16 December 1863.

== Union service ==
Chatham was turned over to the South Atlantic Blockading Squadron and commissioned on 22 June 1864, Master E. L. Smith in command.

Assigned as harbor ship at Port Royal, South Carolina, Chatham transported men and supplies in the harbor throughout the remainder of the war, providing support to the South Atlantic Blockading Squadron as it carried out its mission of cutting the Confederacy off from overseas sources of supply.

Chatham was decommissioned in April 1865 and sold on 2 September.
