= Chatham (CDP), Massachusetts =

Chatham, Massachusetts
- Census-designated place
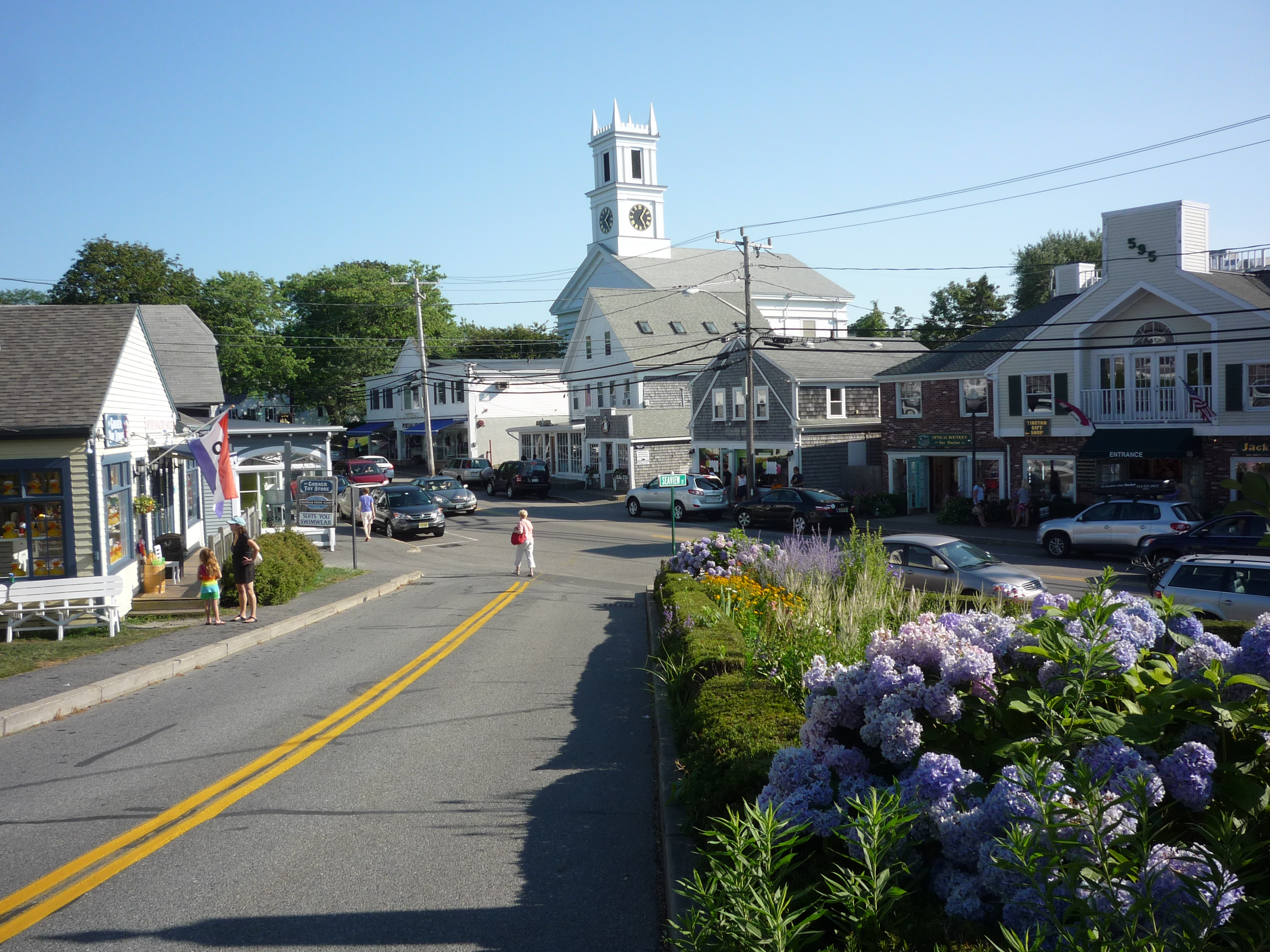
- Chatham Downtown

- Location in Barnstable County and the state of Massachusetts.
- Coordinates: 41°40′46″N 69°57′43″W
- Country: United States
- State: Massachusetts
- County: Barnstable
- Town: Chatham

Area
  - Total: 3.49 sq mi (9.03 km^{2})
  - Land: 2.64 sq mi (6.83 km^{2})
  - Water: 0.85 sq mi (2.20 km^{2})
- Elevation: 13 ft (4 m)

Population (2020)
  - Total: 1,551
  - Density: 588.1/sq mi (227.06/km^{2})
- Time zone: UTC-5 (Eastern (EST))
  - Summer (DST): UTC-4 (EDT)
- ZIP code: 02633
- Area code: 508
- FIPS code: 25-12960
- GNIS feature ID: 0615912

Chatham is a census-designated place (CDP) in the town of Chatham in Barnstable County, Massachusetts, United States. The population was 1,421 at the 2010 census, out of 6,125 in the entire town of Chatham.

== Geography ==
Chatham is located at 41°40′45″N 69°57′42″W (41.679321, -69.961868).

According to the United States Census Bureau, the CDP has a total area of 3.5 square miles (9.0 km^{2}), of which 2.6 square miles (6.8 km^{2}) is land and 0.85 square miles (2.2 km^{2}) (24.36%) is water.

== Demographics ==
Historical population
Census	Pop.	Note	%±
2020	1,551		—
U.S. Decennial Census

As of the census of 2000, there were 1,667 people, 813 households, and 438 families residing in the CDP. The population density was 242.9 people/km^{2} (629 people/mi^{2}). There were 1,886 housing units at an average density of 274.8 units/km^{2} (712 units/mi^{2}). The racial makeup of the CDP was 94.18% White, 2.22% Black or African American, 0.18% Native American, 0.30% Asian, 2.10% from other races, and 1.02% from two or more races. Hispanic or Latino of any race were 1.86% of the population.

There were 813 households, out of which 13.5% had children under the age of 18 living with them, 45.4% were married couples living together, 5.3% had a female householder with no husband present, and 46.1% were non-families. 40.0% of all households were made up of individuals, and 22.1% had someone living alone who was 65 years of age or older. The average household size was 1.92 and the average family size was 2.52.

In the CDP, the population was spread out, with 13.6% under the age of 18, 5.2% from 18 to 24, 19.4% from 25 to 44, 29.4% from 45 to 64, and 32.5% who were 65 years of age or older. The median age was 53 years. For every 100 females, there were 91.2 males. For every 100 females age 18 and over, there were 86.2 males.

The median income for a household in the CDP was $47,037, and the median income for a family was $65,938. Males had a median income of $32,417 versus $31,339 for females. The per capita income for the CDP was $28,542. About 0.9% of families and 7.8% of the population were below the poverty line, including 0.9% of those under age 18 and 10.8% of those age 65 or over.
