= Monomoy Wilderness =

Wilderness area in Massachusetts, United States

- IUCN category Ib (wilderness area)
- Location within the United States
- Location: Barnstable County, Massachusetts, United States
- Nearest city: Chatham, Massachusetts
- Coordinates: 41°35′02″N 69°59′18″W
- Area: 3,244 acres (13 km^{2})
- Established: 1970
- Governing body: US Fish & Wildlife Service

The Monomoy Wilderness is a 3,244-acre (13 km^{2}) wilderness area south of Cape Cod in the U.S. state of Massachusetts. It is located within the Monomoy National Wildlife Refuge and is administered by the US Fish & Wildlife Service. Severe winter storms isolated Monomoy Point from the mainland in 1958 and, 20 years later, separated North Monomoy Island from South Monomoy Island. Sand dunes on the eastern shore of the islands give way to salt marsh and then to mudflats on the western shore. The ecosystem is a perfect habitat for migratory birds.

Dubbed a sanctuary for wildlife in 1944, most of Monomoy National Wildlife Refuge has been designated wilderness. This includes the entire north island and all but two tracts on the south island. The mainland portion of the Refuge is not wilderness.

== Wildlife ==
Among the migratory birds seen in the Monomoy Wilderness are grebes, shearwaters, petrels, gannets, bitterns, egrets, herons, swans, geese, ducks, and the endangered piping plover and roseate tern. Hundreds of grey and harbor seals winter along the coastline as well.

== See also ==
- List of U.S. Wilderness Areas
- Wilderness Act
