= Chatham, Massachusetts =

- Town
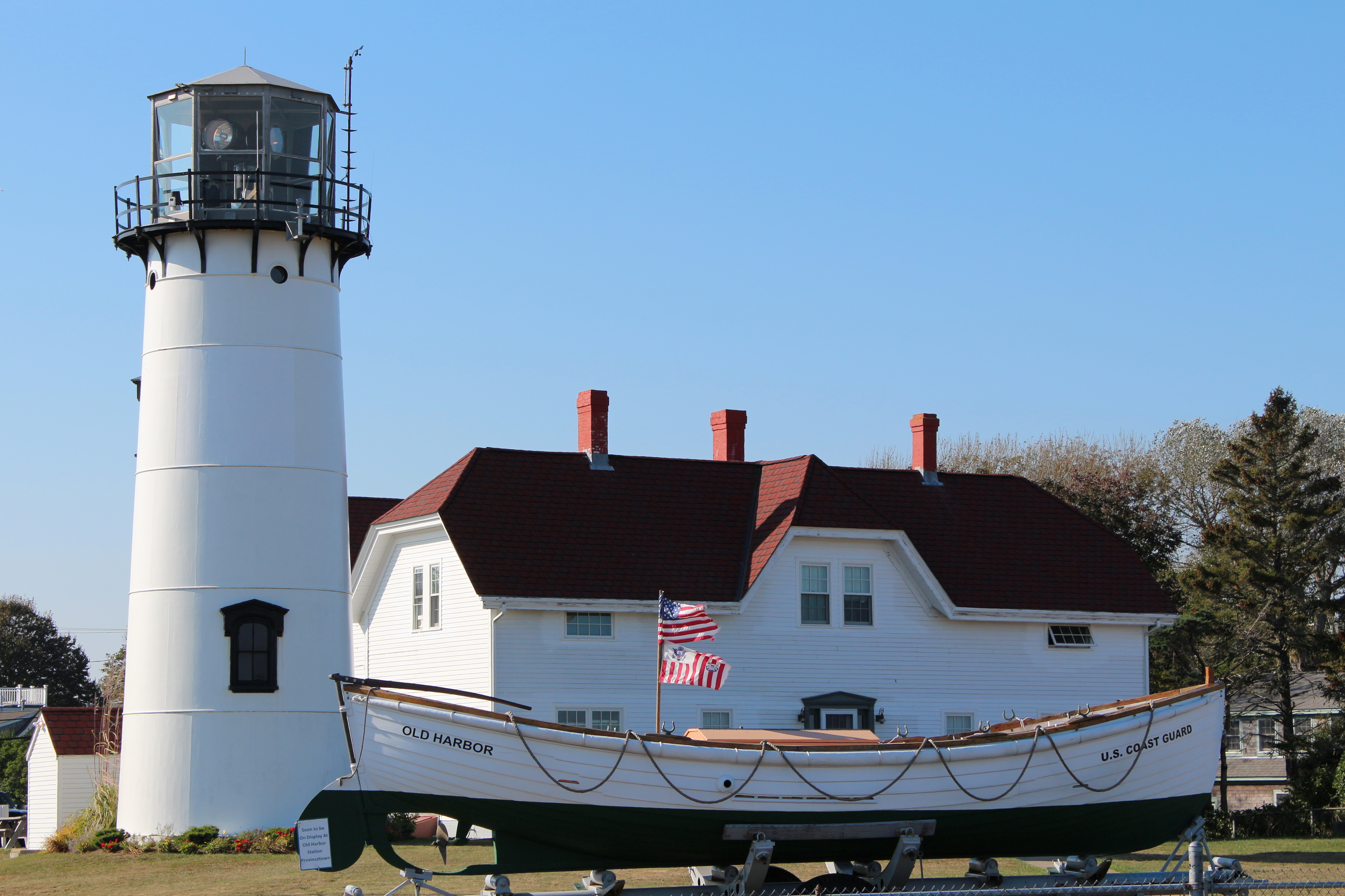
- Chatham Light

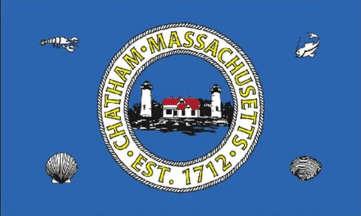
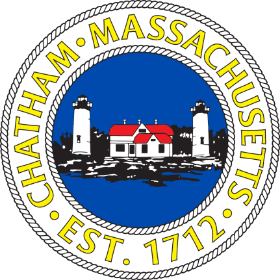
- Flag Seal

- Location in Barnstable County, Massachusetts
- Coordinates: 41°40′55″N 69°57′37″W
- Country: United States
- State: Massachusetts
- County: Barnstable
- Settled: 1664
- Incorporated: 1712
- Named After: Chatham, Kent
- Communities: Chatham; Chatham Port; North Chatham; Quitnesset; South Chatham; West Chatham

Government
  - Type: Open town meeting
  - Town Manager: Jill Goldsmith

Area
  - Total: 24.4 sq mi (63.2 km^{2})
  - Land: 16.1 sq mi (41.8 km^{2})
  - Water: 8.3 sq mi (21.4 km^{2})
- Elevation: 46 ft (14 m)

Population (2020)
  - Total: 6,594
  - Density: 409/sq mi (157.8/km^{2})
- Time zone: UTC−5 (Eastern)
  - Summer (DST): UTC−4 (Eastern)
- ZIP Codes: 02633 (Chatham); 02659 (South Chatham); 02650 (North Chatham)
- Area code: 508/774
- FIPS code: 25-12995
- GNIS feature ID: 0618250
- Website: www.chatham-ma.gov

Chatham (/ˈtʃætəm/) is a town on Cape Cod in Massachusetts. Chatham is located at the southeastern tip of Cape Cod and has historically been a fishing community. First settled by the English in 1664, the township was originally called Monomoit based on the indigenous population's term for the region. Chatham was incorporated as a town on June 11, 1712, and has become a summer resort area. The population was 6,594 at the 2020 census and can swell to 25,000 during the summer months. There are four villages that comprise the town, those being Chatham (CDP), South Chatham, North Chatham, and West Chatham. Chatham is home to the Monomoy National Wildlife Refuge and the decommissioned Monomoy Point Light, both located on Monomoy Island. A popular attraction is the Chatham Light, which is an operational lighthouse that is operated by the United States Coast Guard.

== History ==
Before European settlement, today's Chatham, Massachusetts, was inhabited by the Monomyick people.The Monomyick people relied on farming, fishing, and hunting for food and resources to survive. In 1606, the French explorer Samuel de Champlin encountered around 500 to 600 Monomoyick people living in what is now Chatham. In 1656, William Nickerson purchased land from the Monomyick people. These purchases led to legal disputes due to the lack of approval from the colonial government. In 1712, Chatham became recognized as an official town of the Province of Massachusetts, leaving behind its previous town name of Monamoy.

During the 1700s, Chatham's economy depended on fishing, farming, and the maritime trade. The American Revolution disrupted maritime transportation and increased the risk of British forces capturing American ships. Following the war, maritime industries continued to develop in Chatham. Shipbuilding, salt production, and fishing supported the town's economy. Businesses connected to these industries operated along the shoreline, including rope making and areas used to dry fish. Fishing remained one of the town's most important industries.

The development of Chatham's maritime industries influenced the growth of its coastal neighborhoods. One of these neighborhoods was Old Village, near Chatham Harbor and Mill Pond. Its location provided access to waterways used for fishing and boating. During the 1800s, the surrounding area contained residential buildings and businesses focused on maritime activities. Old Village's development reflected Chatham's dependence on the surrounding coastline.

Chatham's maritime history also influenced the construction of navigational structures along the coast. The Twin Lighthouses were first established in 1808 to assist ships navigating nearby waters. Coastal erosion led to the replacement and relocation of the lighthouses during the 1800s. In 1887, two new lighthouse tower were constructed further inland. In 1923, one of the lighthouses was moved to Eastham, leaving a single Lighthouse in Chatham. The remaining Chatham Lighthouse continues to serve as a landmark associated with the town's maritime history.

In addition to the maritime structures, Chatham contains residential neighborhoods that represent the different periods of architecture development. Old Village includes many buildings dating back from the 1700s through the 1900s. Many of the homes in Chatham were built in the traditional Cape Cod style, which commonly features wooden shingles, simple rectangular floor plans, and sloped roofs. These architectural features were used in residential construction throughout coastal Massachusetts. The remaining historic buildings provide examples of the town's development through the decades.

During the late nineteenth century, Chatham's economy expanded beyond its traditional maritime industries. The arrival of the railroad in 1887 improved transportation connections between Chatham and other Massachusetts communities.Rail access also supported the development of tourism by making the town more accessible to seasonal visitors.Tourism became another part of Chatham's economy alongside the fishing and other coastal industries. The towns historic buildings, harbor, and coastal neighborhoods remain physical evidence of its development from a maritime settlement into a residential and seasonal destination.

1. Town of Chatham. “History.” https://www.chatham-ma.gov/407/History

2. Massachusetts Department of Conservation and Recreation. https://www.mass.gov/files/documents/2018/01/17/chatham-recon-report_0.pdf]

3. https://oldvillagechatham.org/the-old-village/

=== Historical sites and museums ===
- Atwood House (1752)
- Caleb Nickerson House (1772)
- Chatham Railroad Museum (1887)
- Josiah Mayo House (c. 1820) chathamconservationfoundation.org
- Chatham Marconi Maritime Center (1914)
- Chatham Windmill (1797)
- Chatham Lighthouse (1808)
- Eldredge Public Library (1896)

== Geography ==
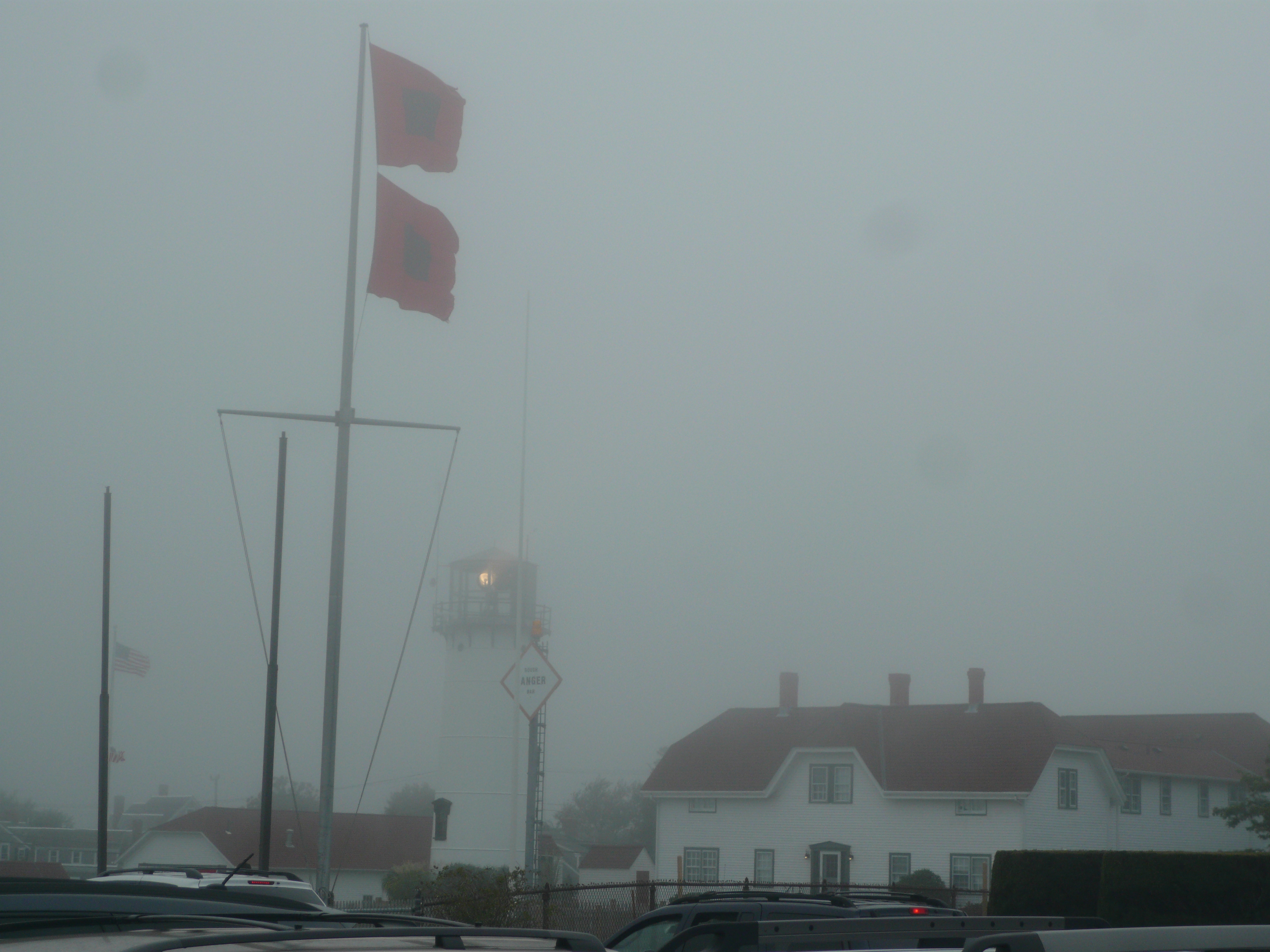
Chatham Lighthouse during Hurricane Earl on September 3, 2010

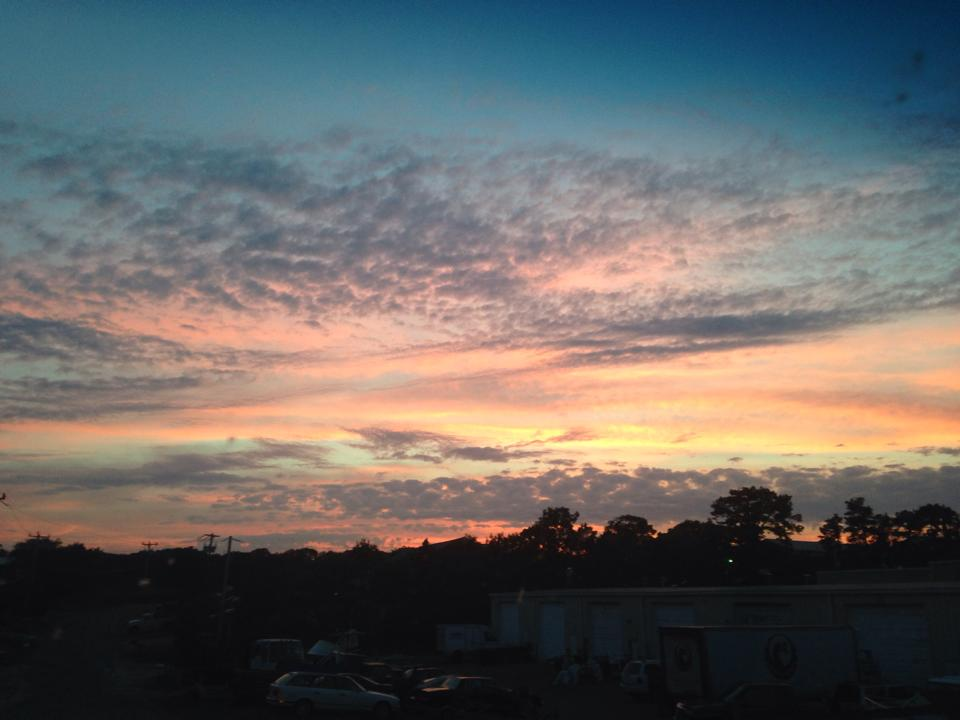
Sunset in Chatham

The town occupies the southeast corner (the "elbow") of Cape Cod. The town's villages include Chatham proper, Chatham Port, North Chatham, West Chatham, and South Chatham (west of West Chatham). Chatham is bordered by Harwich to the west, Pleasant Bay and Orleans to the north, the Atlantic Ocean to the east, and Nantucket Sound to the south. The town is 35 miles (56 km) south of Provincetown and east of the Sagamore Bridge, 20 miles (32 km) east of Barnstable, and 85 miles (137 km) southeast of Boston.

According to the United States Census Bureau, the town has a total area of 24.4 square miles (63.2 km^{2}), of which 16.1 square miles (41.8 km^{2}) is land and 8.3 square miles (21.4 km^{2}), or 33.88%, is water.

The mainland portion of the town is typical of Cape Cod, with several ponds, brooks, rivers, harbors, and inlets around the town. The town includes two narrow strips of land that serve as a barrier between the Atlantic and the mainland; the northern of these is the southern part of the Cape Cod National Seashore. There are several islands, including Strong Island, Tern Island (which is a sanctuary), Morris Island, Stage Island, and Monomoy Island, a 7.25-mile-long (11.67 km) island south of the corner of the town which is home to the Monomoy National Wildlife Refuge. Erosion has changed the region over the years—for example, an island named Slut's Bush once existed until it vanished underwater by the mid-19th century.

== Climate ==
According to the Köppen climate classification system, Chatham, Massachusetts has a warm-summer, wet year-round, humid continental climate (Dfb) bordering on a mild oceanic climate (Cfb). Dfb climates are characterized by at least one month having an average mean temperature ≤ 32.0 °F (≤ 0.0 °C), at least four months with an average mean temperature ≥ 50.0 °F (≥ 10.0 °C), all months with an average mean temperature ≤ 71.6 °F (≤ 22.0 °C), and no significant precipitation difference between seasons. The average seasonal (Nov-Apr) snowfall total is approximately 30 inches (76 cm). The average snowiest month is February, which corresponds with the annual peak in nor'easter activity. The plant hardiness zone is 7b, with an average annual extreme minimum air temperature of 5.2 °F (–14.9 °C).

Climate data for Chatham, Massachusetts (1991–2020 normals, extremes 1972–2021)
Month	Jan	Feb	Mar	Apr	May	Jun	Jul	Aug	Sep	Oct	Nov	Dec	Year
Record high °F (°C)	58 (14)	58 (14)	70 (21)	81 (27)	88 (31)	90 (32)	95 (35)	93 (34)	85 (29)	82 (28)	68 (20)	62 (17)	95 (35)
Mean maximum °F (°C)	52.3 (11.3)	50.1 (10.1)	55.3 (12.9)	63.3 (17.4)	73.1 (22.8)	81.0 (27.2)	84.7 (29.3)	83.3 (28.5)	78.9 (26.1)	71.1 (21.7)	62.8 (17.1)	55.9 (13.3)	86.4 (30.2)
Mean daily maximum °F (°C)	38.6 (3.7)	38.9 (3.8)	43.1 (6.2)	51.1 (10.6)	59.7 (15.4)	69.0 (20.6)	75.9 (24.4)	75.8 (24.3)	70.3 (21.3)	61.1 (16.2)	52.0 (11.1)	44.0 (6.7)	56.6 (13.7)
Daily mean °F (°C)	31.7 (−0.2)	31.9 (−0.1)	36.9 (2.7)	45.3 (7.4)	53.9 (12.2)	62.8 (17.1)	69.5 (20.8)	69.4 (20.8)	64.4 (18.0)	54.9 (12.7)	45.8 (7.7)	37.6 (3.1)	50.3 (10.2)
Mean daily minimum °F (°C)	24.9 (−3.9)	25.0 (−3.9)	30.7 (−0.7)	39.5 (4.2)	48.1 (8.9)	56.6 (13.7)	63.1 (17.3)	62.9 (17.2)	58.4 (14.7)	48.7 (9.3)	39.6 (4.2)	31.2 (−0.4)	44.1 (6.7)
Mean minimum °F (°C)	8.8 (−12.9)	12.4 (−10.9)	17.9 (−7.8)	31.6 (−0.2)	39.6 (4.2)	48.4 (9.1)	56.4 (13.6)	57.1 (13.9)	49.1 (9.5)	37.8 (3.2)	27.3 (−2.6)	17.8 (−7.9)	6.9 (−13.9)
Record low °F (°C)	−6 (−21)	−4 (−20)	7 (−14)	19 (−7)	33 (1)	44 (7)	51 (11)	47 (8)	40 (4)	31 (−1)	18 (−8)	0 (−18)	−6 (−21)
Average precipitation inches (mm)	3.97 (101)	3.84 (98)	4.71 (120)	4.01 (102)	3.30 (84)	3.17 (81)	2.80 (71)	3.20 (81)	3.78 (96)	4.31 (109)	4.12 (105)	4.72 (120)	45.93 (1,167)
Average snowfall inches (cm)	7.5 (19)	9.9 (25)	3.8 (9.7)	0.5 (1.3)	0.0 (0.0)	0.0 (0.0)	0.0 (0.0)	0.0 (0.0)	0.0 (0.0)	0.0 (0.0)	0.2 (0.51)	2.6 (6.6)	24.5 (62)
Average extreme snow depth inches (cm)	5.5 (14)	5.8 (15)	3.1 (7.9)	0.4 (1.0)	0.0 (0.0)	0.0 (0.0)	0.0 (0.0)	0.0 (0.0)	0.0 (0.0)	0.0 (0.0)	0.0 (0.0)	2.3 (5.8)	8.8 (22)
Average precipitation days (≥ 0.01 in)	12.4	10.9	11.7	11.5	11.0	9.6	8.2	8.3	8.7	10.8	10.6	12.9	126.6
Average snowy days (≥ 0.1 in)	3.6	3.9	1.8	0.2	0.0	0.0	0.0	0.0	0.0	0.0	0.2	1.5	11.2
Source: NOAA

== Ecology ==
The area surrounding Chatham is home to diverse flora and fauna, including many species that rely on the wetlands for survival. The salt marshes and lakes that exist in the region due to glacial action from the last ice age are essential habitats for many species, such as ospreys (Pandion haliaetus) and striped bass (Morone saxatilis). These wetlands not only promote biodiversity but also act as natural filters, retaining particulates and purifying the water that flows into nearby estuaries and bays. However, Chatham's beaches have experienced significant vegetation loss in recent decades due to both natural and human causes. Despite this, the beaches remain important nesting sites for various species of sea turtles and shorebirds, such as the Piping Plover (Charadrius melodus), while the waters off the coast are rich in marine life, including seals (Halichoerus grypus), whales, and sharks, such as the great white shark (Carcharodon carcharias). In fact, the prevalence of sharks in the waters surrounding Chatham has resulted in its reputation as a hub of great white activity and shark attacks. To help protect and preserve the local flora and fauna, several conservation areas and nature preserves have been established in Chatham, including Monomoy Island, which provides an important breeding ground for the Piping Plover.

According to the A. W. Kuchler U.S. Potential natural vegetation Types, Chatham, Massachusetts would primarily contain a Northeastern Oak/Pine (110) vegetation type with a Southern Mixed Forest (26) vegetation form.

== Transportation ==
All five roads that exit Chatham cross into Harwich. The two state routes that pass through the town are Route 28 and the southern end of Route 137. Route 28 circles through the center of town before exiting and heading north toward Route 6A, joining that route until the roads end at the Orleans Rotary.

Rail service no longer extends to the town; the former rail bed is a bicycling path and is called the Old Colony Rail Trail. The Old Colony Rail Trail crosses into Chatham and runs through South Chatham and then into West Chatham before ending at Crowell Road near downtown. In addition, another bicycle route passes through the town, starting at the end of the Rail Trail, and providing views of Chatham Fish Pier, Chatham Bars, and Chatham Light.

The town is the home to the Chatham Municipal Airport, which provides local service to other small airports on the Cape and islands. The nearest national and international air service can be reached at Logan International Airport in Boston.

== Demographics ==
Historical population
Year	Pop.	±%
1790	1,140	—
1850	2,439	+113.9%
1860	2,710	+11.1%
1870	2,411	−11.0%
1880	2,250	−6.7%
1890	1,954	−13.2%
1900	1,749	−10.5%
1910	1,564	−10.6%
1920	1,737	+11.1%
1930	1,931	+11.2%
1940	2,136	+10.6%
1950	2,457	+15.0%
1960	3,273	+33.2%
1970	4,554	+39.1%
1980	6,071	+33.3%
1990	6,579	+8.4%
2000	6,625	+0.7%
2010	6,125	−7.5%
2020	6,594	+7.7%
2023*	6,685	+1.4%
* = population estimate.

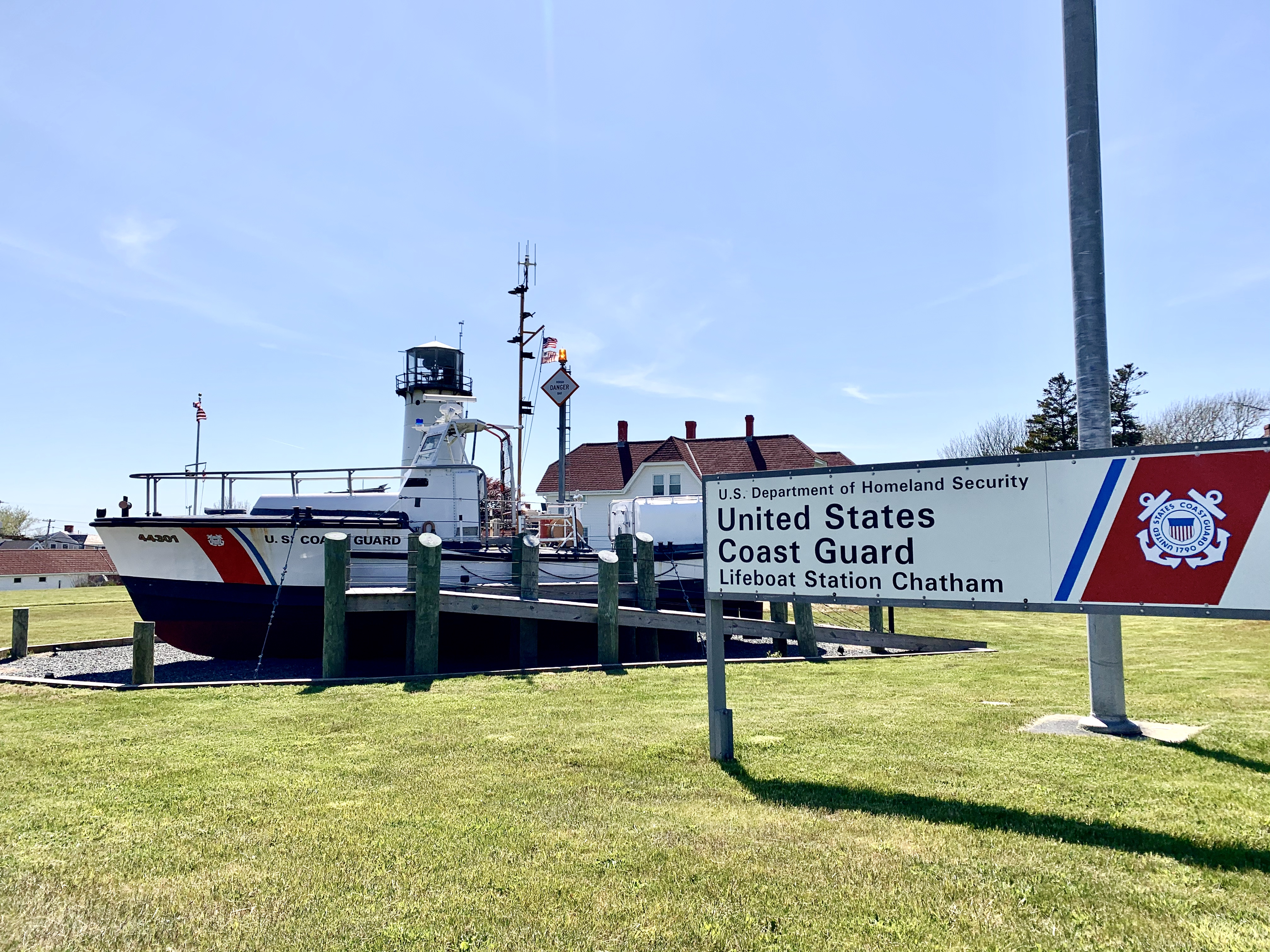
Chatham Lighthouse and Coast Guard Station, 2020

As of the census of 2000, there were 6,625 people, 3,160 households, and 1,886 families residing in the town. The population density was 408.4 inhabitants per square mile (157.7/km^{2}). At the time of the census, there were 6,743 housing units at an average density of 415.7 per square mile (160.5/km^{2}). The racial makeup of the town was 96% White, 1.9% Black or African American, 0.2% Native American, 0.3% Asian, <0.1% Pacific Islander, 0.9% from other races, and 0.8% from two or more races. Hispanic or Latino of any race were 1.0% of the population.

During the summer months (generally Memorial Day through Labor Day), the town's population triples to approximately 20,000, not counting the additional transient tourist population hosted by the town's many hotels, inns, motels, and bed and breakfasts. Tourism and hospitality, along with commercial fishing, make up the town's main industry. The town has a thriving commercial fish pier where dayboats unload fresh fish and lobster.

There were 3,160 households, out of which 15.3% had children under the age of 18 living with them, 51.2% were married couples living together, 6.0% had a female householder with no husband present, and 40.3% were non-families. 34.7% of all households were made up of individuals, and 18.8% had someone living alone who was 65 years of age or older. The average household size was 2.00 and the average family size was 2.52.

In the town, the population was spread out, with 13.3% under the age of 18, 4.4% from 18 to 24, 19.8% from 25 to 44, 28.2% from 45 to 64, and 34.3% who were 65 years of age or older. The median age was 54 years. For every 100 females, there were 89.3 males. For every 100 females age 18 and over, there were 85.4 males.

The local K–12 school system has approximately 700 students, and the average high school grade size is between 30 and 40 students.

The median income for a household in the town was $85,519, and the median income for a family was $112,750. Males had a median income of $71,064 versus $40,365 for females. The per capita income for the town was $48,594. About 1.9% of families and 4.8% of the population were below the poverty line, including 5.1% of those under age 18 and 3.7% of those age 65 or over.

== Government ==
Chatham is represented in the Massachusetts House of Representatives as a part of the Fourth Barnstable district, which includes (with the exception of Brewster) all the towns east and north of Harwich on the Cape. The town is represented in the Massachusetts Senate as a part of the Cape and Islands District, which includes all of Cape Cod, Martha's Vineyard, and Nantucket except the towns of Bourne, Falmouth, Sandwich, and a portion of Barnstable.

The Chatham Police Department is the primary law enforcement agency that services the town. It is staffed for 24-hour patrol and is a member of the Cape Cod Regional Law Enforcement Council. The Police station was recently constructed in 2012 and is located on George Ryder Road, across the street from the Chatham Municipal Airport. Troopers from the Massachusetts State Police Troop D Yarmouth barracks provide secondary law enforcement services to the town.

The Chatham Fire/Rescue Department is a 24-hour, fully staffed fire department that provides fire and medical services to the town. The new fire station was constructed in 2016 and is located on Depot Road, across the street from Veterans Field. Prior to 2012, the fire and police stations were attached and sat on the Depot Road site. The Chatham Fire/Rescue Department also has an unmanned substation on Route 28 in South Chatham; this station houses one engine truck.

On the national level, Chatham is a part of Massachusetts's 9th congressional district and is represented by William R. Keating. The state's senior (Class II) member of the United States Senate, elected in 2012, is Elizabeth Warren. The junior (Class I) senator is Ed Markey.

Chatham is governed by the open town meeting form of government, administered by an elected Board of Selectmen and an appointed Town Manager. The town has four post offices, all located at various points along Route 28. The town is home to the Eldredge Public Library, named for its benefactor Marcellus Eldredge and designed by a student of H. H. Richardson. The town operates several piers, beaches, boat landings, and recreation areas. The nearest hospital is Cape Cod Hospital in Hyannis.

== Education ==
Until 2013, Chatham operated its own school system for the town's 700 students. The Chatham Elementary School served students from pre-kindergarten through fourth grade, the Chatham Middle School served students from fifth through eighth grade, and Chatham High School served grades nine through twelve. Chatham's athletics teams were known as the Blue Devils and wore blue and white. In December 2010, Chatham and the neighboring town of Harwich voted to regionalize their school systems into the Monomoy Regional school system. The Monomoy teams are known as the Sharks, and their colors are navy blue and silver. In March 2013, construction began in Harwich on a new high school to serve the region, expected to open in 2014. High school students may attend Cape Cod Regional Technical School in Harwich free of charge. Other private schools are located in nearby Brewster and Harwich.

== Sports and recreation ==
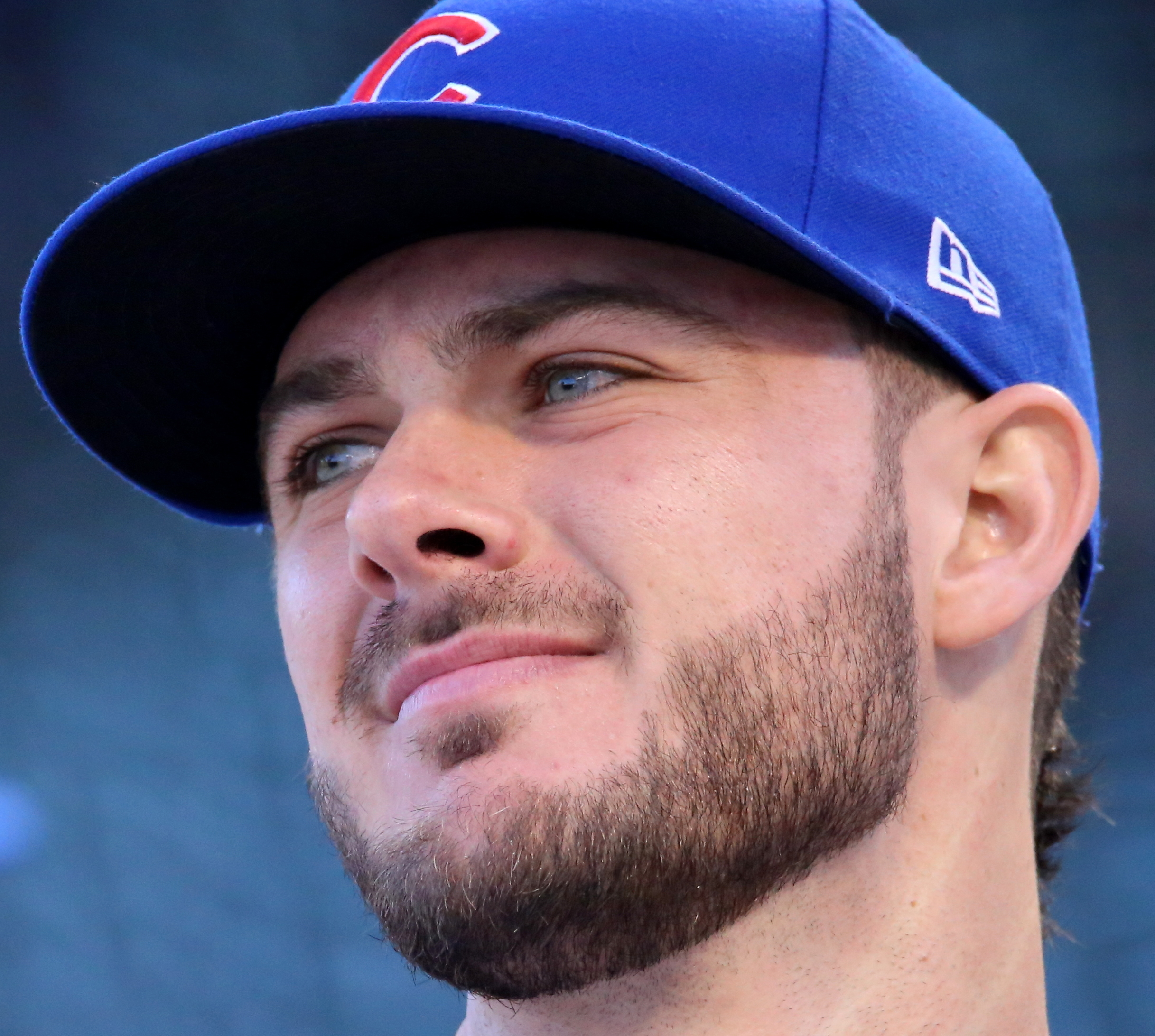
Kris Bryant played for the Chatham Anglers in 2011.

Chatham is home to the Chatham Anglers, an amateur collegiate summer baseball team in the Cape Cod Baseball League. The team plays at Veterans Field and has featured dozens of players who went on to careers in Major League Baseball, such as Thurman Munson, Jeff Bagwell, and Kris Bryant.

Eastward Ho! Golf Course is a notable golf course in town. The course hosted a PGA Tour event, The Cape Cod Open, in the 1930s.

== In popular culture ==
The romantic comedy, Summer Catch, is largely set in Chatham. It stars a Chatham A's baseball player, portrayed by Freddie Prinze Jr., and his love interest, portrayed by Jessica Biel.

== Notable people ==
- Zered Bassett, pro skateboarder, grew up in Chatham
- Shirley Booth, actress
- Ruby Braff, musician, died in Chatham
- Louis Brandeis, Supreme Court Justice
- Bernard Cornwell, best-selling author
- Franklin Cover, late actor
- David Drumm, former CEO of Anglo Irish Bank
- Todd Eldredge, champion figure skater
- Jack Forrester, Scottish-American professional golfer
- Lisa Genova, best-selling author
- Bobby Hackett, musician
- Julie Harris, actress
- Gilbert Knapp, Wisconsin State Assemblyman
- Karen E. Lasser, medical researcher and senior editor at Journal of the American Medical Association
- Joseph C. Lincoln, author of Cape Cod Stories
- Joseph Lord, Puritan pastor
- Sara Pennypacker, children's book author
- Bill Richardson, American politician, author, and diplomat
- Christopher Seufert, film director/photographer
- Maxim D. Shrayer, bilingual author
- Archelaus Smith, Nova Scotia pioneer
- Bob Staake, cartoonist & illustrator
- Tisquantum (Squanto), died in Chatham and is buried in an unmarked grave on Burial Hill, overlooking Ryder's Cove
- Stuart Varney, talk show host
- Bernard C. Webber, Coast Guardsman who was award the Gold Lifesaving Medal for leading a rescue to the SS Pendleton in 1952

== Gallery ==
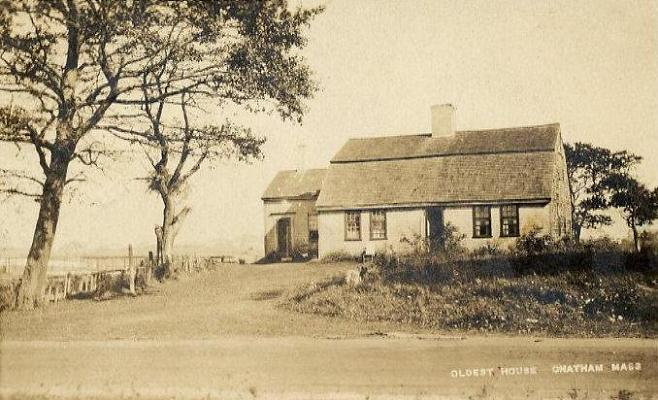
The Atwood House

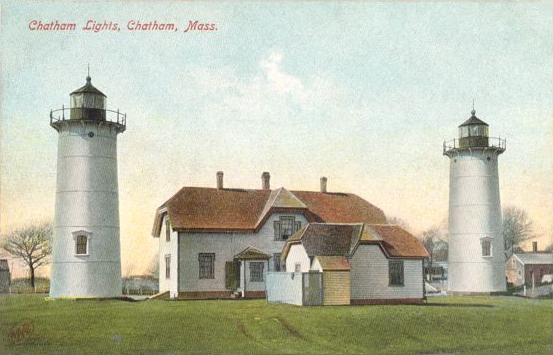
Chatham Lights

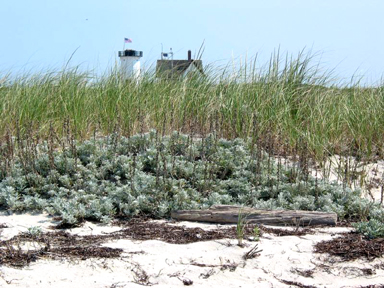
Stage Harbor Light

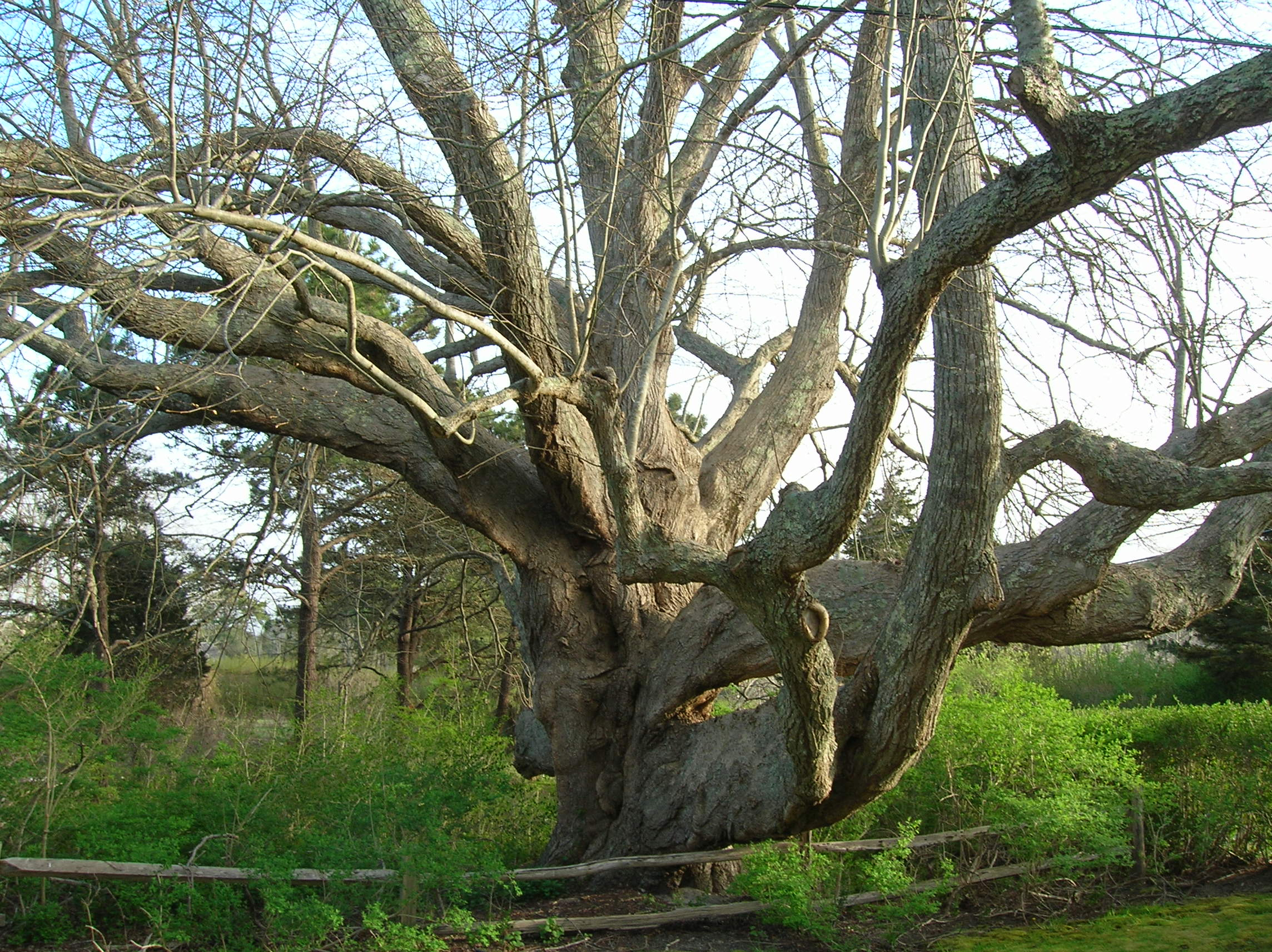
Old Linden Tree (April 2012)

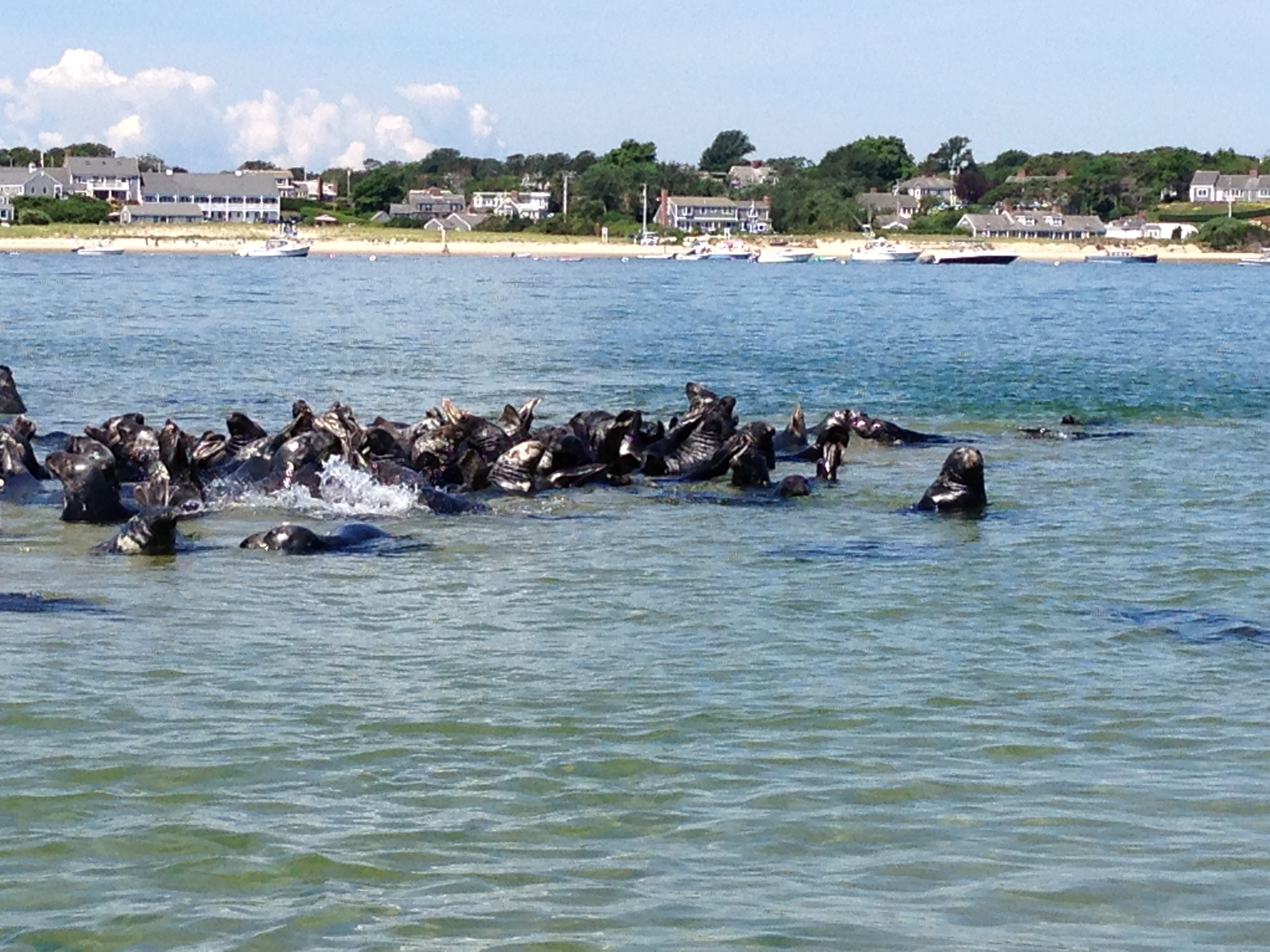
Seals in Chatham Harbor

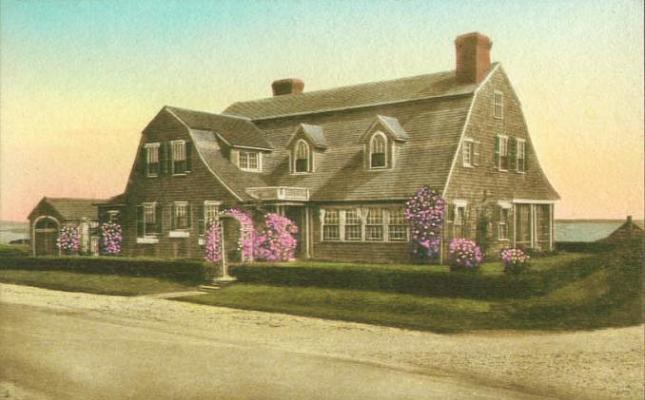
Cross Trees

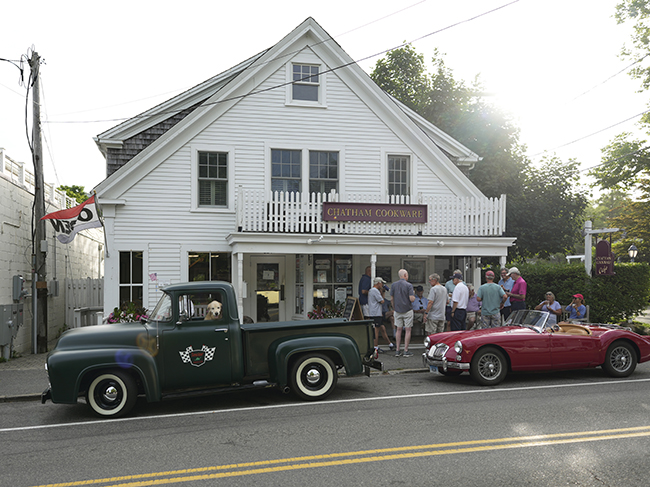
Chatham Cookware (Summer 2024)

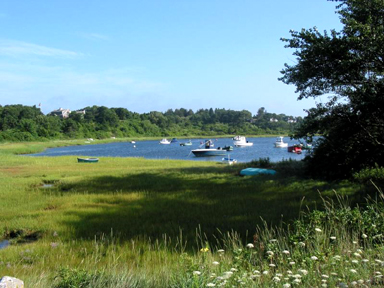

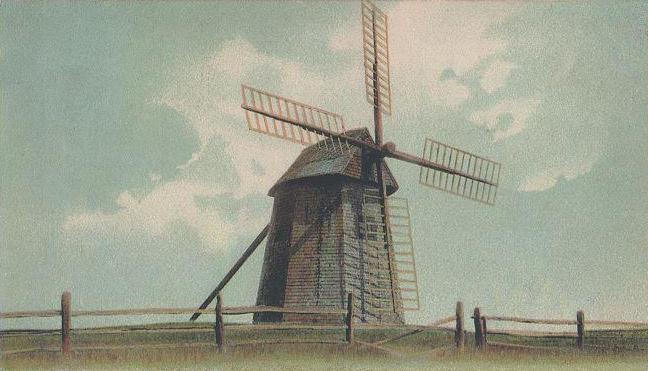
