= Monomoy Island =

Spit of sand extending southwest from Chatham, Cape Cod off the Massachusetts mainland

Coordinates: 41°35′53″N 69°59′18″W

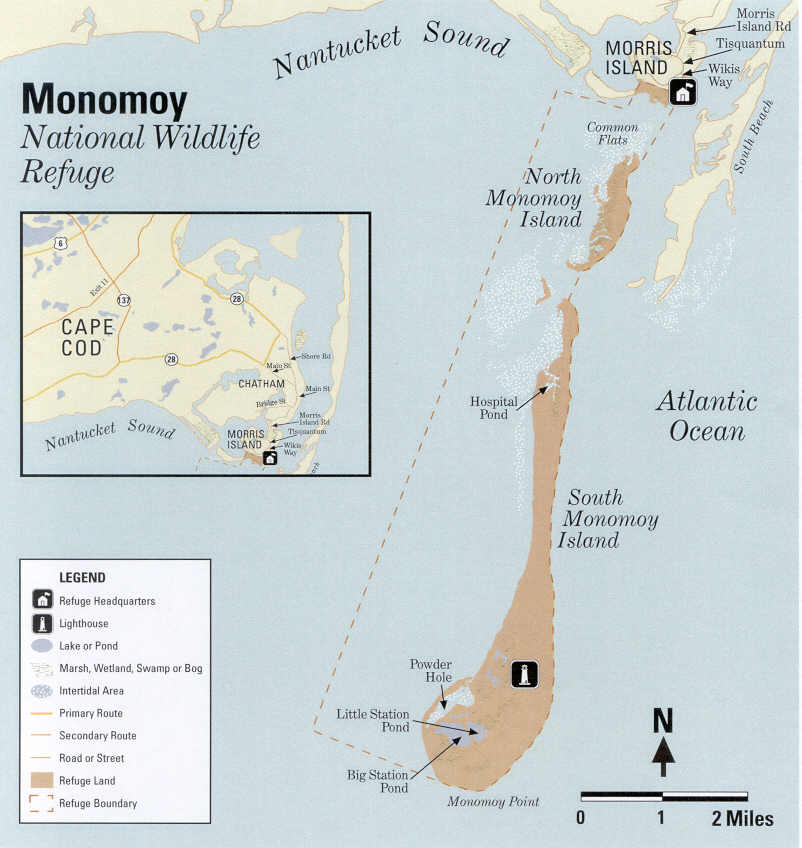
Map of Monomoy National Wildlife Refuge area.

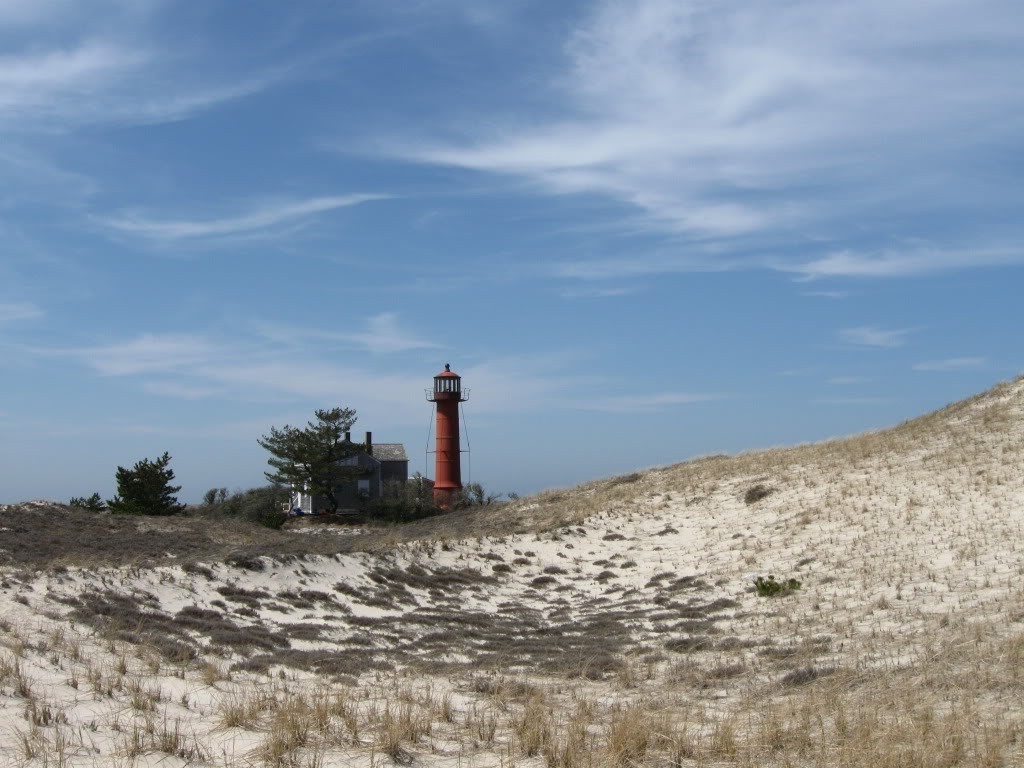
Monomoy Lighthouse is located on Monomoy Island.

Monomoy Island is an 8-mile-long (13-kilometre) spit of sand extending southwest from Chatham, Cape Cod off the Massachusetts mainland. Because of shifting sands and water levels, it is often connected to the mainland, and at other times is separated from it. It is home to the Monomoy National Wildlife Refuge. It is referred to in the 1691 Massachusetts Charter as Cape Mallabar, also spelled Cape Malabar.

== History ==
This seems to be the “Mallebare” (bad shoals) on Samuel de Champlain’s 1607 map of the Gulf of Maine.

It remained uninhabited until 1863 when it was reconstructed and reinhabited until 1876.

A storm in the spring of 1958 carved a wide, shallow channel between Morris Island and Monomoy, separating it from the mainland. The Blizzard of 1978 further divided the island into North Monomoy and South Monomoy. A storm during the winter of 2006-2007 once again reconnected South Monomoy to the mainland, although North Monomoy remains an island. The island was designated a Federal Wildlife Refuge in 1970, serving as an important stop on the migratory routes of 285 species of birds. Since gaining federal protection in 1972, gray seals have become a common sight on Monomoy and nearby Chatham's South Beach island. Part of the refuge is the Monomoy Wilderness.

Monomoy was taken over by the US government just before World War II. In 1944, the island was home to the Monomoy Island Gunnery Range, mainly used by the US Army Air Forces and other services for bombing and aerial gunnery practice, with the Monomoy National Wildlife Refuge established the same year. The gunnery range was abandoned by 1951, while the wildlife refuge still exists. The former gunnery and bombing range was surveyed under the United States Army Corps of Engineers Formerly Used Defense Sites (FUDS) program for possible unexploded ordnance in 1995. None was found, though the survey noted that similar searches took place in 1950 and 1951, and circa 1965 the wildlife refuge manager at the time found some 5 lb (2.3 kg) practice bombs. By 1995 the former bombing target was under water due to shifting of the island.

Since 2013, there has been a surge of Sharks near Cape Cod including Atlantic great white shark sightings off the coast of the islands. Some of the sharks have been tagged by the crew of the F/V Ezyduzit.
