= Pinchot =

Pinchot may refer to:

- Amos Pinchot, American lawyer and reformist, brother of Gifford Pinchot
- Antoinette Pinchot Bradlee, American socialite and ceramist, daughter of Amos Pinchot
- Bronson Pinchot, American actor
- Elaine Joyce Pinchot, American actress
- Gifford Pinchot, American forester and politician, first Chief of the United States Forest Service, and Governor of Pennsylvania
- Gifford Pinchot III, American entrepreneur, co-founder of the Bainbridge Graduate Institute, and Gifford's grandson
- James W. Pinchot, Gifford's father
- Mary Pinchot Meyer, American socialite and painter, daughter of Amos Pinchot
- Rosamond Pinchot, American socialite, stage and film actress, daughter of Amos Pinchot

Or to:

- Camp Pinchot Historic District
- Gifford Pinchot House
- Gifford Pinchot National Forest
- Gifford Pinchot State Park
- Lake Pinchot
- Mount Pinchot (disambiguation)
- Pinchot Institute for Conservation
- Pinchot Juniper
- Pinchot Pass, on the John Muir Trail
- Pinchot Sycamore
- Pinchot University
- Pinchot Trail System
- Pinchot–Ballinger controversy
- Pinchote
