= James Truitt =

American journalist

- Born: James McConnell Truitt; 1920 or 1921; Chicago, Illinois, U.S.
- Died: November 18, 1981; San Miguel de Allende, Mexico
- Education: University of Virginia
- Occupation: Journalist
- Spouse(s): Anne Truitt (1947–1971); Evelyn Patterson
- Children: Alexandra Truitt; Mary Truitt; Sam Truitt

James McConnell Truitt (June 17, 1921 – November 19, 1981) was an American journalist who worked for Life and Time magazines. He later became the vice president of Newsweek magazine.

He is known for being quoted by the National Enquirer in 1976 as alleging that Mary Pinchot Meyer, the ex-wife of Cord Meyer, had a two-year affair with John F. Kennedy.

== Early life and career ==
Born in Chicago, Illinois on June 17, 1921, and raised in Baltimore, Truitt was the son of Eleanor (née McConnell) and Dr. Ralph Purnell Truitt, a psychiatrist associated with the Mental hygiene movement, and an advocate for the rehabilitation of the criminally insane. Named after his uncle, James Robert McConnell, Truitt later majored in English at the University of Virginia, graduating summa cum laude in 1943.

After serving as a Naval officer in the Pacific theatre of World War II, Truitt returned to work for the US State Department. He married his first wife, sculptor Anne Truitt, in September 1947 in Washington, D.C. In spring 1948 he went to work for Life magazine in New York, then became their Washington correspondent. He spent three years with Life in San Francisco, then he returned to Washington, D.C., in May 1960 to become the personal assistant to Philip Graham at the Washington Post, where he rose to become vice president. He also worked for Time, served as publisher of Art News, and became vice president of Newsweek in 1964.

Later in 1963, Truitt left the Post and moved to Tokyo as the Japan bureau chief for Newsweek. The Truitts later returned to Washington and to the Post.

== Allegations about Mary Pinchot Meyer ==
The March 2, 1976, issue of the National Enquirer quoted Truitt as stating Mary Pinchot Meyer, the ex-wife of Cord Meyer, had a two-year affair with John F. Kennedy and that they smoked marijuana in a White House bedroom. According to Truitt, their first rendezvous occurred after Meyer was chauffeured to the White House in a limousine driven by a Secret Service agent where she was met by Kennedy and taken to a bedroom. He stated that Meyer and Kennedy regularly met in that manner, sometimes two or three times each week, until his assassination. Truitt said the two would "usually have drinks or dinner alone or sometimes with one of the aides", and claimed that Meyer offered marijuana cigarettes to Kennedy after one such meeting on April 16, 1962. He said after they smoked three joints she commented, "This isn't like cocaine. I'll get you some of that." According to the Enquirer, Meyer also kept a diary of the affair. The paper quoted Tony Bradlee — Meyer's sister — as confirming the existence of the affair and the diary, stating that Bradlee found the diary in Meyer's studio after her death, then turned it over to James Jesus Angleton who subsequently burned it at CIA headquarters.

In an interview with a correspondent from The Washington Post, Truitt confirmed the Enquirer's account, stated that Meyer had told him of the affair, and that he had kept notes about what he had been told. According to Truitt, Meyer and Kennedy met approximately 30 times — frequently when Jackie Kennedy was out of town — from January 1962 until the time of the President's death in November 1963. Truitt stated that the two would occasionally have drinks or dinner with one of Kennedy's aides, whom he identified as David Powers and Timothy J. Reardon Jr. Contradicting his earlier account with the Enquirer, Truitt said Kennedy gave the marijuana to Meyer. Truitt acknowledged that he received payment from the Enquirer, but did not disclose the amount of payment.

Reardon subsequently denied Truitt's account, and Powers was reported to have been unavailable for comment. Kennedy's appointments secretary Kenneth O'Donnell also denied Truitt's allegations of a love affair, stating that Meyer "knew Jackie as well as she knew Jack." He said Meyer made infrequent visits to the White House through his office, but that none of them were ever arranged privately. When the Associated Press asked Tony Bradlee about the affair, she responded: "I knew nothing about it when Mary was alive. I have no further comment." She also told The Washington Post: "The National Enquirer quoted my words out of context to make it appear as though I corroborated their story." Angleton acknowledged that Meyer had been a "cherished friend" to him and his wife and that he had assisted her family after her death in a "purely private capacity", but refused to say whether there had been a diary. According to the Post, an unidentified source said that Meyer's diary was found, primarily discussing art along with a vague reference to an unnamed friend, then destroyed in keeping with her wishes.

While reporting on the allegations, the AP, UPI and The Washington Post cited records from the United States District Court for the District of Columbia that indicated Truitt's former wife had sought a conservatorship for Truitt as part of their 1969 divorce and support proceedings. Given that a physician certified that Truitt had been suffering from a mental illness that was "such as to impair his judgment and cause him to be irresponsible", a court-appointed conservator was named to manage his financial matters. According to the Post: "Washington attorneys familiar with the matter said he has written many rambling and bitter letters in recent years to Ben Bradlee and others threatening exposure of alleged scandals."

== Later years and death ==
In the years that followed, Truitt's mental health declined. In 1969, Ben Bradlee forced him to resign from the Post, with accusations of mental incompetence. Truitt accepted a settlement in exchange for a signed statement that he would not write anything that was "in any way derogatory" of the Washington Post. Truitt and Anne divorced in 1971, and he moved to Mexico, where he married Evelyn Patterson.

Truitt committed suicide on November 18, 1981, in San Miguel de Allende, Mexico. He had been described by his first wife, Anne, as being "so ill".

== Sources ==
- Nina Burleigh, A Very Private Woman : The Life and Unsolved Murder of Presidential Mistress Mary Meyer (Bantam: 1998) (pp. 23, 124, 129, 140-1, 168-9, 171-2, 193, 211-2, 284, 286-8)
- Bradlee, Benjamin C., A Good Life. Simon & Schuster: New York, 1995. (pp. 270–271, 299).
- Kelly, Tom. The imperial Post: The Meyers, the Grahams, and the paper that rules Washington. 1983 (pp. 120, 157, 213-4)
- Nobilem, Phillip, and Rosenbaum, Ron. "The Circus Aftermath of JFK's Best and Brightest Affair." New Times 9 Jul. 1976: 22-33.
- von Hoffman, Nicholas. "Unasked Questions." The New York Review of Books, 10 June 1976: 3+.
- Ward, Bernie, and Toogood, Granville. "JFK 2-Year White House Romance." National Enquirer 2 Mar. 1976: 1. (Interviews James Truitt, story picked up by Washington Post, NYROB, others.)
