= Janney =

Janney may refer to:

== People ==
- Allison Janney (born 1959), American actress
- Christopher Janney (born 1950), American interactive sound and light artist
- Craig Janney (born 1967), American retired hockey player
- Edward Janney an American musician, producer and artist
- Ernest Lloyd Janney (1893–1941), Provisional Commander of the Canadian Aviation Corps from 1914 to 1915
- Eli H. Janney (1831–1912), American inventor
- Eli Janney (musician), American record producer and musician
- Frederick Wistar Morris Janney (1919–1979), Central Intelligence Agency officer
- Jack R. Janney (1924–2006), American structural engineer and innovator in the understanding of structural collapses
- John Janney (1798–1872), Virginia politician, president of the American Virginia Secession Convention
- Leon Janney (1917–1980), American actor and radio personality
- Peter Janney (born 1947), American writer and psychologist
- Russell Janney (1884–1963), American theatrical producer and novelist
- William Janney (1908–1992), American actor
- Janney Marín Rivera (born 1985), better known as Chiquis Rivera, American singer and television personality

== Other uses ==
- Janney Elementary School, Washington, DC, United States, on the National Register of Historic Places
- Janney (automobile), an American automobile produced by the Janney Motor Company in 1906

== See also ==
- Janney House, Hamilton, Virginia, United States, on the National Register of Historic Places
- Janney coupler, a railroad device invented by Eli H. Janney
- Zoltán Jeney
