= Peter Janney =

American writer, psychologist, and lecturer

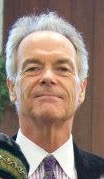
- Born: Peter Wistar Janney; September 13, 1947 (age 79); New Haven, Connecticut, U.S.
- Education: Princeton University (BA); Berklee School of Music; Boston University (EdD); Duke University (MBA)
- Occupations: Psychologist; author; lecturer
- Writing career
- Genre: Non-fiction
- Notable works: Mary's Mosaic: The CIA Conspiracy to Murder John F. Kennedy, Mary Pinchot Meyer, and Their Vision for World Peace
- Website: marysmosaic.net/bio.htm

Peter Janney (born September 13, 1947) is an American writer, psychologist and lecturer based in Beverly, Massachusetts. He is best known for his book Mary's Mosaic: The CIA Conspiracy to Murder John F. Kennedy, Mary Pinchot Meyer, and Their Vision for World Peace, in which he makes a detailed case that ex-CIA wife and John F. Kennedy mistress Mary Pinchot Meyer was murdered by the CIA in order to cover up what she had discovered about the assassination of John F. Kennedy.

== Early life and education ==
Janney was born in New Haven, Connecticut. He was raised in Washington, D.C. His father, Frederick Wistar Morris Janney, was a senior career CIA official who began work at the Agency shortly after its inception in 1947. His mother, Mary Draper Janney, graduated from Vassar College in the same class as Mary Pinchot Meyer. During the 1950s and 1960s, the Janney family socialized with many of Washington's social and political elite, including the family of Mary and Cord Meyer, another high-level CIA member.

Janney was fond of Mary whose son Michael was his very close friend. Away at boarding school in October 1964, when Meyer was murdered, Janney learned about her death only in November when he returned home for Thanksgiving vacation. Her murder had a disturbing impact upon Janney which he carried into adulthood.

Janney graduated from The Holderness School in Plymouth, New Hampshire, in 1966, then went to Princeton University, graduating in 1970. He majored in psychology and history and wrote his senior thesis under the guidance of Martin Duberman. After spending two years studying jazz at The Berklee College of Music in Boston, he entered the Program in Existential Humanistic Psychology at Boston University, where he received his doctorate in 1981.

== Career ==
After completing his doctorate, Janney became a licensed psychologist in Massachusetts where he has been a practicing psychotherapist and health consultant for more than 30 years. Frustrated by the impact of managed health care, he earned an MBA from Duke University.

In March 1976, the National Enquirer revealed that Mary Pinchot Meyer had been having a serious romantic affair with President John F. Kennedy during the last two years before his assassination in 1963. The story gained much media attention and prompted Janney to start his own investigation of the matter.

In 1998, Janney was interviewed by Nina Burleigh for the book, A Very Private Woman: The Life and Unsolved Murder of Presidential Mistress Mary Meyer. Janney ultimately did not agree with many of the conclusions in the Burleigh book, including her belief that Ray Crump had committed the Meyer murder. Having started work on a screenplay about the life of Meyer in 2004, Janney resumed his research into her life and death, located Damore’s research assistant Mark O'Blazney and obtained from him all of Leo Damore's research material on Meyer. It was at this point Janney committed to write a book about Meyer and why she had been murdered. Janney’s research led him to conclude that his father had not only been a part of the conspiracy to murder Meyer, but had been instrumental in the CIA cover up in the assassination of Kennedy

In 2012, Janney published Mary's Mosaic: The CIA Conspiracy to Murder John F. Kennedy, Mary Pinchot Meyer, and Their Vision for World Peace after more than 30 years of research. Mary's Mosaic demonstrates that Meyer was murdered by the CIA because she had discovered how the CIA had been involved in Kennedy's assassination and was planning to go public with what she had learned. Janney also argues in the book that Meyer and Kennedy were deeply in love with each other and that, at her instigation, they experimented with a hallucinogen, most likely LSD or Psilocybin. Janney maintains that Meyer helped Kennedy turn away from the Cold War mentality toward world peace initiatives.

== Media reviews ==
Janney's book has been the subject of coverage in TV shows, radio talk shows, newspapers and magazines. Author Jim Marrs wrote that "Mary's Mosaic just might have solved a great murder mystery. This is a must-read." Writing for BWW Reviews, John Walker Ross stated: "[Janney's theory] might seem a little far-fetched even for assassination buffs, but Janney certainly presents a consistently intriguing and often compelling case." However, others criticized the book strongly. In a Daily Beast online review of Janney’s book, Nina Burleigh challenged some of Janney’s conclusions, reaffirming her belief that Ray Crump probably killed Meyer. Janney pointed out, in response, that Burleigh had failed to read the FBI Crime Report on the murder, which documented the absence of any forensic evidence linking Crump to the bloody murder scene, or the body of Meyer.

== Awards ==
In 2012, Mary's Mosaic won first place in the general non-fiction category at the Hollywood Book Festival, received Honorable Mentions at the New England Book Festival and at the London Book Festival.
