= Frederick Wistar Morris Janney =

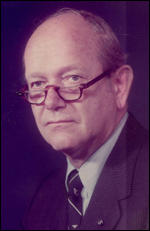
- Born: March 15, 1919; Bryn Mawr, Pennsylvania, US
- Died: January 18, 1979 (aged 59); Metropolitan Club, Washington, D.C., US
- Education: Princeton University (B.A. 1941); Yale University (M.A. 1948); Harvard University (AMP 1969)
- Spouse: Mary Draper
- Children: 2
- Awards: Distinguished Intelligence Medal; Navy Cross; Distinguished Flying Cross (2); Navy Air Medal (3)
- Espionage activity
- Allegiance: United States of America
- Service branch: Central Intelligence Agency United States Navy
- Service years: 1941–1979

Frederick Wistar Morris Janney (March 15, 1919 – January 18, 1979) was a career Central Intelligence Agency officer who was recruited by Allen Dulles in 1949. He held a number of positions during his thirty-year career and was awarded the Agency's highest honor, the Distinguished Intelligence Medal, four days after his death.

== Early and personal life ==
Janney was born March 15, 1919, in Bryn Mawr, Pennsylvania, on Philadelphia's Main Line. “Wistar,” as he was affectionately called by his family, was one of six children of Walter Coggeshall Janney and Pauline Flower Morris. His father was a prominent Philadelphia investment banker who maintained a large estate in Bryn Mawr and a summer home on Cape Cod near Woods Hole, Massachusetts.

Wistar Janney attended the Fessenden School in West Newton, Massachusetts, and Phillips Exeter Academy, graduating from Phillips Exeter in 1937. He then attended Princeton University and pursued a major in politics, graduating in June 1941.

Janney married Mary Draper of Brooklyn, New York, in January 1944, between his Pacific tours, and returned from combat in the Pacific in 1945. The two entered Yale University graduate school on the G.I. Bill; she studied sociology, and he studied Russian Area Studies. They each graduated in 1948.

== World War II ==
Janney graduated from Princeton in 1941 and enlisted in the Naval Air Corps. He trained at the Corpus Christi Naval Air Station in Texas in the newly designed Grumman Avenger Torpedo Bomber and became a designated Naval Aviator in April 1942. He was assigned to Torpedo Squadron 13 (VT-13) on the USS Franklin aircraft carrier.

Lt. Janney became a seasoned combat pilot during two tours of duty in the Pacific Theater and was awarded two Distinguished Flying Crosses and three Navy Air Medals. On October 25, 1944, as the Flight-Executive Officer for Torpedo Squadron 13, he led the squadron into the Battle of Leyte Gulf, the largest naval battle in history. He personally scored a direct torpedo hit on the Japanese aircraft carrier Zuihō, which eventually sank. For his leadership at Leyte Gulf, he was awarded the Navy Cross.

== CIA career ==
World War II had a profound impact on a number of elite, well-educated combat veterans. Janney was a part of an idealistic young group, including Cord Meyer, Jr., Tracy Barnes, Desmond FitzGerald, Frank Wisner, who were determined to prevent another nuclear conflict. Along with Meyer, Barnes, FitzGerald and others, Janney was recruited by Allen Dulles into the newly formed Central Intelligence Agency (CIA), and he and his wife moved their family from New Haven to Washington, D.C., where others they knew were beginning their careers.

Early in his CIA career, Janney was assigned to the Office of Current Intelligence. By 1963, he had become Chief of the Sino-Soviet Bloc Area, according to Victor Marchetti, who worked for him at this time. Janney later served in the Agency's new Science & Technology directorate (DS&T), formed in late 1963. He first worked for Col. Lawrence K. “Red” White, and then became chief deputy to directorate head Carl Duckett, according to Dino Brugioni, who worked at the National Photographic Interpretation Center (NPIC) which was part of DS&T.

Janney's last position at CIA was as Director of Personnel, which he began in 1975. During this time, the CIA was engaged in extensive litigation regarding the Freedom of Information Act (FOIA), seeking to block the release of documents that, it argued, exposed "sources and methods" of intelligence work. "In many fields," said Janney in his role as CIA personnel director, "it is absolutely essential that the Agency have available to it the single greatest source of expertise: the American academic community." The CIA has also argued that revelations of academic involvement with the Agency would expose certain academics to "shame and ridicule" of their peers, which author Ami Chen Mills suggested was "a tacit admission that at least some of these people have something to be ashamed of."

== Subject of conspiracy theory ==
Wistar's son, Peter Janney, has claimed that Wistar was part of a CIA team that orchestrated the October 1964 murder of Mary Pinchot Meyer, the ex-wife of CIA official Cord Meyer and an alleged mistress of United States President John F. Kennedy, because she was prepared to publicly dispute the Warren Commission's findings in the assassination of Kennedy.
