= Academy Art Museum =

Art Museum in Easton, Maryland, U.S.

Coordinates: 38°46′20″N 76°04′27″W

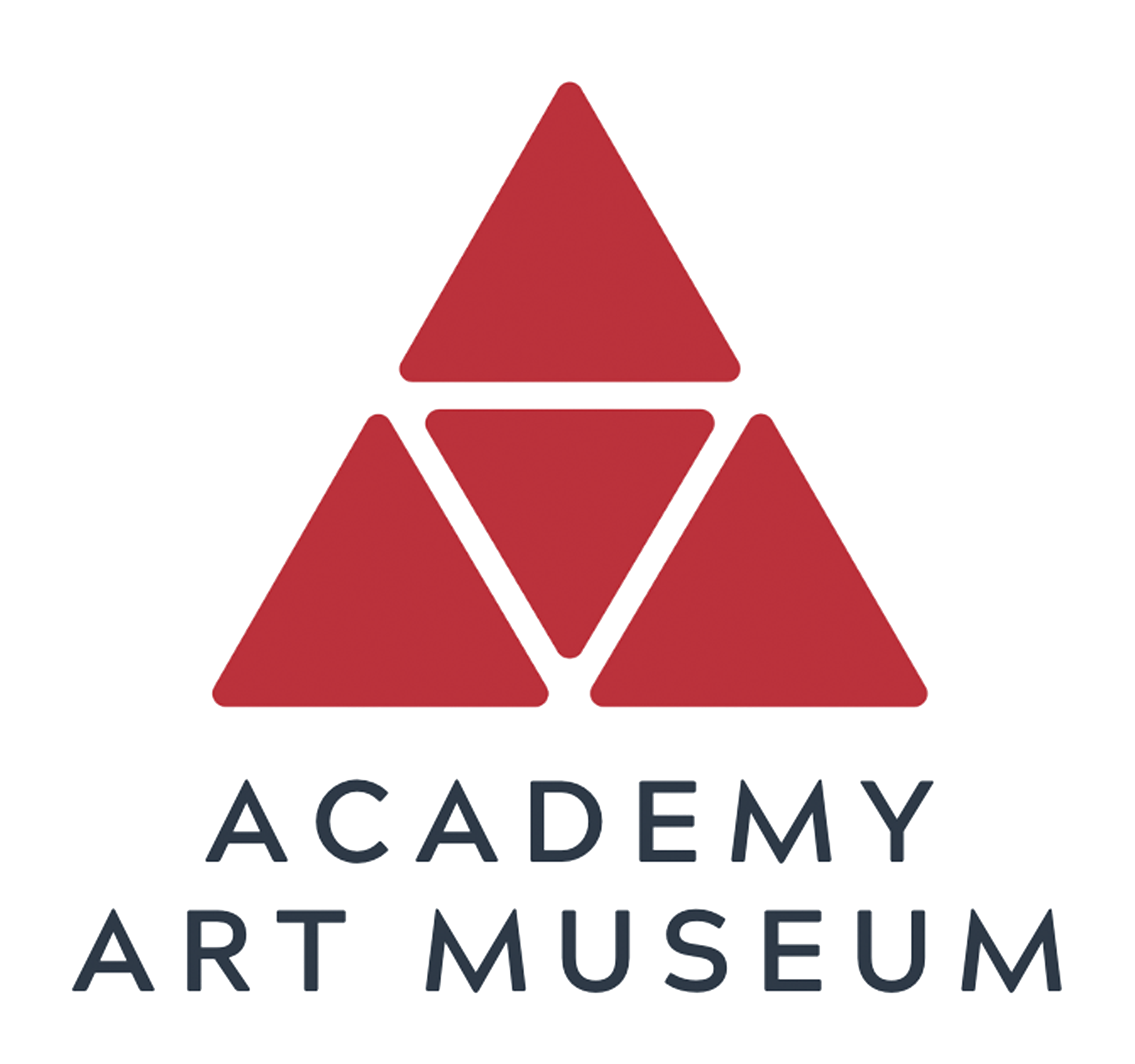

- The museum in 2023
- Former name: Academy of the Arts
- Established: 1958
- Location: 106 South St, Easton, Maryland, U.S.
- Type: Art Museum
- Accreditation: American Alliance of Museums
- Director: Charlotte Kasic
- Website: academyartmuseum.org

The Academy Art Museum is an art education and exhibition complex in Easton, Maryland. Its mission is to promote the knowledge, practice, and appreciation of the arts and to enhance cultural life on the Eastern Shore.

== History ==
The organization was originally founded as the Academy of the Arts by a group of local artists led by sculptor Lee Lawrie in 1958. After initial exhibitions in an empty church, the Academy moved to its current home, a historic schoolhouse, in 1960.

In its early years, the Academy was run exclusively by volunteers, until a growing schedule of exhibitions and classes spurred the hiring of the first curator in 1972, and the first director, Anna Larkin, in 1978. A major renovation in 1989 connected the schoolhouse with the neighboring Thomas-Hardcastle House via a glass atrium. Further renovations added a performing arts hall and dance studio and moved the entrance to the Harrison Street courtyard. The name of the institution was changed to the Academy Art Museum in 2000 to reflect its evolving purpose. It was accredited by the American Alliance of Museums in 2003.

== Programs ==
The museum hosts exhibitions, concerts, lectures, educational programs and visual and performing arts classes for adults and children. The Academy has a professional relationship with the nearby National Gallery of Art, Baltimore Museum of Art and the Walters Art Museum.

== Collection ==
Started in 1967 with a gift of eleven works on paper, the permanent collection currently contains over 1500 works by artists including Francisco Goya, Paul Cézanne, Pablo Picasso and Joan Miró. Among the late 20th century collection are pieces by Judy Chicago, Mary Cassatt, Jim Dine, Richard Diebenkorn, Robert Motherwell, Elizabeth Murray, Frederick Hammersley, Philip Pearlstein, Man Ray, Robert Rauschenberg, Larry Rivers, James Rosenquist, Kiki Smith, Pat Steir, Jacob Kainen and Anne Truitt. The collection also includes works by photographers such as Berenice Abbott, Ansel Adams, Imogen Cunningham, William Eggleston, John Gossage, Graciela Iturbide, Lisette Model, Zanele Muholi and Aaron Siskind.
