= Anne Truitt =

American sculptor (1921–2004)

- Born: Anne Dean; March 16, 1921; Baltimore, Maryland, U.S.
- Died: December 23, 2004 (aged 83); Washington, D.C., U.S.
- Known for: Sculpture, color field painting
- Movement: Minimalism

A Wall for Apricots, 1968

Anne Truitt (née Dean; March 16, 1921 – December 23, 2004) was an American sculptor. She became well known in the late 1960s for her large-scale minimalist sculptures, especially after her influential solo show at André Emmerich Gallery in 1963 and a group show at the Jewish Museum (Manhattan) in 1966.

Unlike her contemporaries, she made her own sculptures by hand, eschewing industrial processes. Drawing from imagery from her past, her work also deals with the visual trace of memory and nostalgia. This is exemplified by a series of early sculptures resembling monumental segments of white picket fence.

== Early life and education ==
Truitt grew up in Easton, on Maryland's Eastern Shore, and spent her teenage years in Asheville, North Carolina. She graduated from Bryn Mawr College with a degree in psychology in 1943. She declined an offer to pursue a Ph.D. in Yale University’s psychology department and worked briefly as a nurse in a psychiatric ward at Massachusetts General Hospital, Boston. She left the field of psychology in the mid-1940s, first writing fiction and then enrolling in courses offered by the Institute of Contemporary Art in Washington, D.C. She married the journalist James Truitt in 1947, though they divorced in 1971. It was said that James used to tease about Anne's columnar sculptures in referring to the works as "telephone booths".

== Work ==
After leaving the field of clinical psychology in the mid-1940s, Truitt began making figurative sculptures, but turned toward reduced geometric forms after visiting the Guggenheim Museum with her friend Mary Pinchot Meyer to see H.H. Arnason's exhibition "American Abstract Expressionists and Imagists" in November 1961. Truitt remembers that she "spent all that day looking at art…I saw Ad Reinhardt's black canvases, the blacks and the blues. Then I went on down the ramp and rounded the corner and..saw the paintings of Barnett Newman. I looked at them, and from that point on I was home free. I had never realized you could do it in art. Have enough space. Enough color." Truitt was especially inspired by the "universe of blue paint" and the subtle modulation and shades of color in Newman's Onement VI. The singularity of the Abstract Expressionists that she observed in work by Barnett Newman and Ad Reinhardt struck Truitt and sparked a turning point in her work.

Truitt's first wood sculpture, titled First (1961), resembles a picket fence. It consists of three white vertical boards which come to a point—the pickets—which are braced from behind by a white post and two rails. The pickets, post, and rails are all attached to and visually grounded by a white base. The forms contain memories of her past and her childhood geography, rather reflection of a "direct result of an empirical perception." First is a permeable memory of the idea of a fence, of all the fences Truitt has seen, instead of a fence modeled off of a specific image. During a period spent in Japan with her husband, who at the time was the Japan bureau chief for Newsweek, she created aluminum sculptures from 1964 to 1967. Before her first retrospective in New York she decided she did not like the works and destroyed them.

The sculptures that made her significant to the development of Minimalism were aggressively plain and painted structures, often large. Fabricated from wood and painted with monochromatic layers of acrylic, they often resemble sleek, rectangular columns or pillars. Truitt produces in scale drawings of her structures that are then produced by a cabinetmaker. The structures are weighed to the ground and are often hollow, allowing the wood to breathe in changing temperatures. She applies gesso to prime the wood and then up to 40 coats of acrylic paint, alternating brushstrokes between horizontal and vertical directions and sanding between layers. The artist sought to remove any trace of her brush, sanding down each layer of paint between applications and creating perfectly finished planes of colour. The layers of paint build up a surface with tangible depth. Additionally, the palpable surface of paint conveys Truitt's ever-present sense of geography in the alternating vertical and horizontal paint strokes, which mirror the latitude and longitude of an environment. Her process combined "the immediacy of intuition, the remove of prefabrication, and the intimacy of laborious handwork." The recessed platforms under her sculptures raised them just enough off the ground to appear to float on a thin line of shadow. The boundary between sculpture and ground, between gravity and verticality, was made illusory. This formal ambivalence is mirrored by her insistence that color itself, for instance, contained a psychological vibration which when purified, as it is on a work of art, isolates the event it refers to as a thing rather than a feeling. The event becomes a work of art, a visual sensation delivered by color. The Arundel series of paintings, begun in 1973, features barely visible graphite lines and accumulations of white paint on white surfaces. In the custard-color Ice Blink (1989), a tiny sliver of red at the bottom of the painting is enough to set up perspectival depth, as is a single bar of purple at the bottom of the otherwise sky-blue Memory (1981). Begun around 2001, the Piths, canvases with deliberately frayed edges and covered in thick black strokes of paint, indicate Truitt's interest in forms that blur the lines between two and three dimensions.

At her first show at André Emmerich's gallery, Truitt exhibited six works of hand-painted poplar structures, including Ship-Lap, Catawba, Tribute, Platte, and Hardcastle. André Emmerich would go on to be her longtime dealer. Truitt was introduced to Emmerich through Kenneth Noland, who Emmerich also represented. In accounts of her first solo show, one can see the chauvinistic undertones that were present in the 1960s New York art world. Greenberg, Rubin, and Noland chose Truitt's work to exhibit and organized the placement of the show without any input from Truitt herself. They often referred to her as the “gentle wife of James Truitt” and Emmerich encouraged Truitt to drop her first name to conceal her gender, in the hopes that this would help the exhibition's reception. After her first solo show, Greenberg declared in his essay "Recentness of Sculpture" (1967) that Truitt's work "anticipated" minimalist art. Greenberg's statement is sensationalist as Judd, Robert Morris, and Dan Flavin had shown their work prior to hers.

Truitt's drawings are not often remembered when considering her body of work. For much of the 1950s, Truitt worked in pencil, acrylic, and ink to create not only studies for later sculptures, but drawings that existed independently as works of art. Truitt is also known for three books she wrote, Daybook, Turn, and Prospect, all journals. In Prospect, her third volume of reflections, Truitt set out to reconsider her "whole experience as an artist"—and also as a daughter, mother, grandmother, teacher and lifelong seeker. For many years she was associated with the University of Maryland, College Park, where she was a professor, and the artists' colony Yaddo, where she served as interim president.

Truitt died on December 23, 2004, at Sibley Memorial Hospital in Washington, D.C., of complications following abdominal surgery. She was survived by three children and eight grandchildren, among them writer Charles Finch. Her daughter Mary Truitt Hill was married to the art critic Charlie Finch (1953/1954-2022) and they are in turn the parents of the aforementioned Charles.

== Legacy ==
Fielding, H. (2011) Multiple Moving Perceptions of the Real: Arendt, Merleau-Ponty, and Truitt (pages 518–534) This paper explores the ethical insights provided by Anne Truitt's minimalist sculptures, as viewed through the phenomenological lenses of Hannah Arendt's investigations into the co-constitution of reality and Maurice Merleau-Ponty's investigations into perception. Artworks in their material presence can lay out new ways of relating and perceiving. Truitt's works accomplish this task by revealing the interactive motion of our embodied relations and how material objects can actually help to ground our reality and hence human potentiality. Merleau-Ponty shows how our prereflective bodies allow incompossible perceptions to coexist. Yet this same capacity of bodies to gather multiple perceptions together also lends itself to the illusion that we see from only one perspective. If an ethical perspective becomes reified into one position, it then becomes detached from reality, and the ethical potential is actually lost. At the same time, phenomenologically understood, the real world does not exist in terms of static matter, but is instead a web of contextual relations and meanings. An ethics that does not take embodied relations into account—that allows for only one perspective—ultimately loses its capacity for flexibility, and for being part of a common and shared reality.

== Exhibitions ==
Truitt's first one-person exhibition was at the André Emmerich Gallery, New York, in February 1963, and in many senses her work also hews to what was emerging there. Her work was included in the 1964 exhibition, "Black, White, and Gray," at the Wadsworth Atheneum in Hartford, Ct, arguably the first exhibition of Minimal work. She was one of only three women included in the influential 1966 exhibition, Primary Structures at the Jewish Museum in New York. Her work has since been the subject of one-person exhibitions at the Whitney Museum of American Art, New York (1973); the Corcoran Gallery of Art, Washington, D.C. (1974); and the Baltimore Museum of Art (1974, 1992). In 2009, the Hirshhorn Museum and Sculpture Garden, Washington, D.C., organized an acclaimed retrospective of her work, including 49 sculptures and 35 paintings and drawings. "In the Tower: Anne Truitt" was on view at the National Gallery of Art from Nov. 19, 2017 to April 1, 2018.

== Works in collections ==
Arizona

- Summer Treat, 1968, University of Arizona Museum of Art, Tucson

District of Columbia

- Keep, 1962, Smithsonian American Art Museum, Washington
- Insurrection, 1962, Corcoran Gallery of Art, Washington; acquired in 2014 by the National Gallery of Art
- Flower, 1969, Corcoran Gallery of Art, Washington; acquired in 2015 by the National Gallery of Art
- Arundel XI, 1971, National Gallery of Art, Washington
- Summer Dryad, 1971, National Museum of Women in the Arts, Washington
- Mid-Day, 1972, National Gallery of Art, Washington
- Spume, 1972, National Gallery of Art, Washington
- 13 October 1973, 1973, Hirschhorn Museum and Sculpture Garden, Washington
- Sand Morning, 1973, National Gallery of Art, Washington
- 17th Summer, 1974, Smithsonian American Art Museum, Washington
- Night Naiad, 1977, Hirshhorn Museum and Sculpture Garden, Washington
- Parva XII, 1977, National Gallery of Art, Washington
- Summer Remembered, 1981, National Gallery of Art
- Twining Court II, 2002, National Gallery of Art

Maryland

- Ship-Lap, 1962, Baltimore Museum of Art, Baltimore
- Watauga, 1962, Baltimore Museum of Art, Baltimore
- Whale's Eye, 1969, Baltimore Museum of Art, Baltimore
- Three, 1962, Baltimore Museum of Art, Baltimore
- A Wall for Apricots, 1968, Baltimore Museum of Art, Baltimore
- Meadow Child, 1969, Baltimore Museum of Art, Baltimore
- Odeskalki, 1963/82, Baltimore Museum of Art, Baltimore
- Parva IV, 1974, Baltimore Museum of Art, Baltimore
- Lea, 1962, Baltimore Museum of Art, Baltimore
- Carson, 1963, Baltimore Museum of Art, Baltimore
- Moon Lily, 1988, Academy Art Museum, Easton
- Summer '88 No. 25, 1988, Academy Art Museum, Easton
- Hesperides, 1989, Academy Art Museum, Easton
- Summer '96 No. 26. 1996, Academy Art Museum, Easton

Michigan

- 2 Feb '78, 1978, University of Michigan Museum of Art, Ann Arbor
- Sandcastle, 1984, University of Michigan Museum of Art, Ann Arbor

Minnesota

- Australian Spring, 1972, Walker Art Center, Minneapolis

Missouri

- Morning Choice, 1968, St. Louis Art Museum, St. Louis
- Prima, 1978, Mildred Lane Kemper Art Museum, St. Louis

Nebraska

- Still, 1999, Sheldon Memorial Art Gallery, University of Nebraska, Lincoln

New York

- Sentinel, 1978, Albright-Knox Art Gallery, Buffalo
- Carolina Noon, Michael C. Rockefeller Arts Center, New York
- Catawba, 1962, Museum of Modern Art, New York
- Twining Court I, 2001, Museum of Modern Art, New York
- Untitled, 1962, Museum of Modern Art, New York
- Desert Reach, 1971, Whitney Museum of American Art, New York

North Carolina

- Night Wing, 1972–78, Mint Museum, Charlotte
- Stone South No. 36, 1975, North Carolina Museum of Art, Raleigh

Virginia

- Signal, 1978, Federal Reserve Bank of Richmond, Richmond

Wisconsin

- Summer Sentinel, 1963–72, Milwaukee Art Museum, Milwaukee

Germany

- Remembered Sea, 1974, Kunstsammlung Nordrhein-Westfalen, Düsseldorf

== Bibliography ==
- Truitt, Anne (1984-03-06). Daybook: The Journal of an Artist. Harmondsworth, Middlesex, England; New York, N.Y: Penguin Books. ISBN 978-0-14-006963-1.
- Truitt, Anne (1987-11-03). Turn: The Journal of an Artist. New York, N.Y: Penguin Books. ISBN 978-0-14-009249-3.
- Truitt, Anne (1996-03-04). Prospect: The Journal of an Artist (1st ed.). New York: Scribner. ISBN 978-0-684-81835-1.
- Truitt, Anne (2024-03-26). Au Fil des jours, Le Journal d'une artiste, French translation by Catherine Vasseur of DayBook : The Journal of an Artist. Paris : ER Publishing ISBN 978-2-493808-07-3

== Sources ==
- Anne Truitt, Acknowledgements by Roy Slade & Walter Hopps, Copyright 1974 The Corcoran Gallery of Art, Washington, D.C.: printed by Garamond/Pridemark Press, Baltimore, MD LCCC#75-78522
- Hopps, Walter. Anne Truitt, Retrospective: Sculpture and Drawings, 1961-1973. Washington, D.C.: Corcoran Gallery of Art, 1974.
- Livingston, Jane. Anne Truitt: Sculpture 1961 – 1991. New York: André Emmerich Gallery, 1991.
- Meyer, James. Anne Truitt: Early Drawings and Sculpture, 1958-1963. Atlanta: Michael C. Carlos Museum, 2003.
