= Rosamond Pinchot =

American socialite and actress

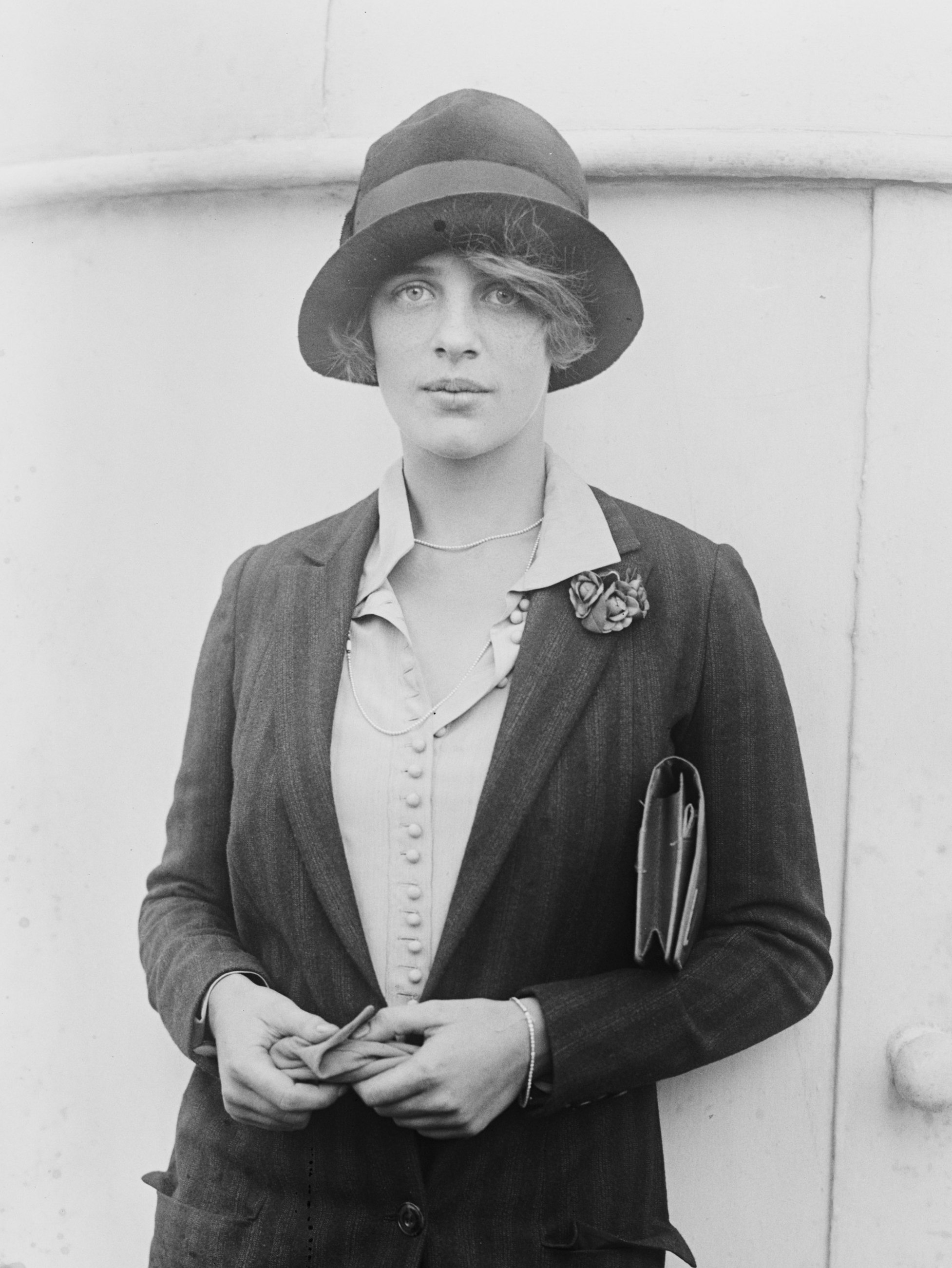
- Portrait, c. 1925
- Born: October 26, 1904; New York City, U.S.
- Died: January 24, 1938 (aged 33); Old Brookville, New York, U.S.
- Cause of death: Asphyxia due to carbon monoxide poisoning
- Resting place: Milford Cemetery
- Other names: Rosamond Pinchot Gaston
- Occupations: Actress, socialite
- Spouse: William Gaston (m. 1928; sep. 1933)
- Children: 2
- Father: Amos Pinchot
- Relatives: Mary Pinchot (half sister); Antoinette Pinchot (half sister); Robert Bowne Minturn Jr. (maternal grandfather); Gifford Pinchot (uncle); Edie Sedgwick (cousin)

Rosamond Pinchot (October 26, 1904 – January 24, 1938) was an American socialite, stage and film actress.

== Early life and career ==
Born in New York City, Pinchot was the daughter of Amos Pinchot, a wealthy lawyer and a key figure in the Progressive Party and Gertrude Minturn Pinchot, the daughter of shipping magnate Robert Bowne Minturn, Jr. She had a younger brother, Gifford (nicknamed Long Giff). Her uncle was Pennsylvania Governor Gifford Pinchot and her cousin was Edie Sedgwick. The family divided their time between their home in New York City and the family estate, Grey Towers, in Milford, Pennsylvania. She graduated from Miss Chapin's School.

Her parents divorced in 1918. After the divorce, Pinchot and her brother lived with their mother in her townhouse in New York City. In 1919, Amos Pinchot married magazine writer Ruth Pickering with whom he would have two more children: Mary Eno and Antoinette "Tony" Pinchot.

== Career ==
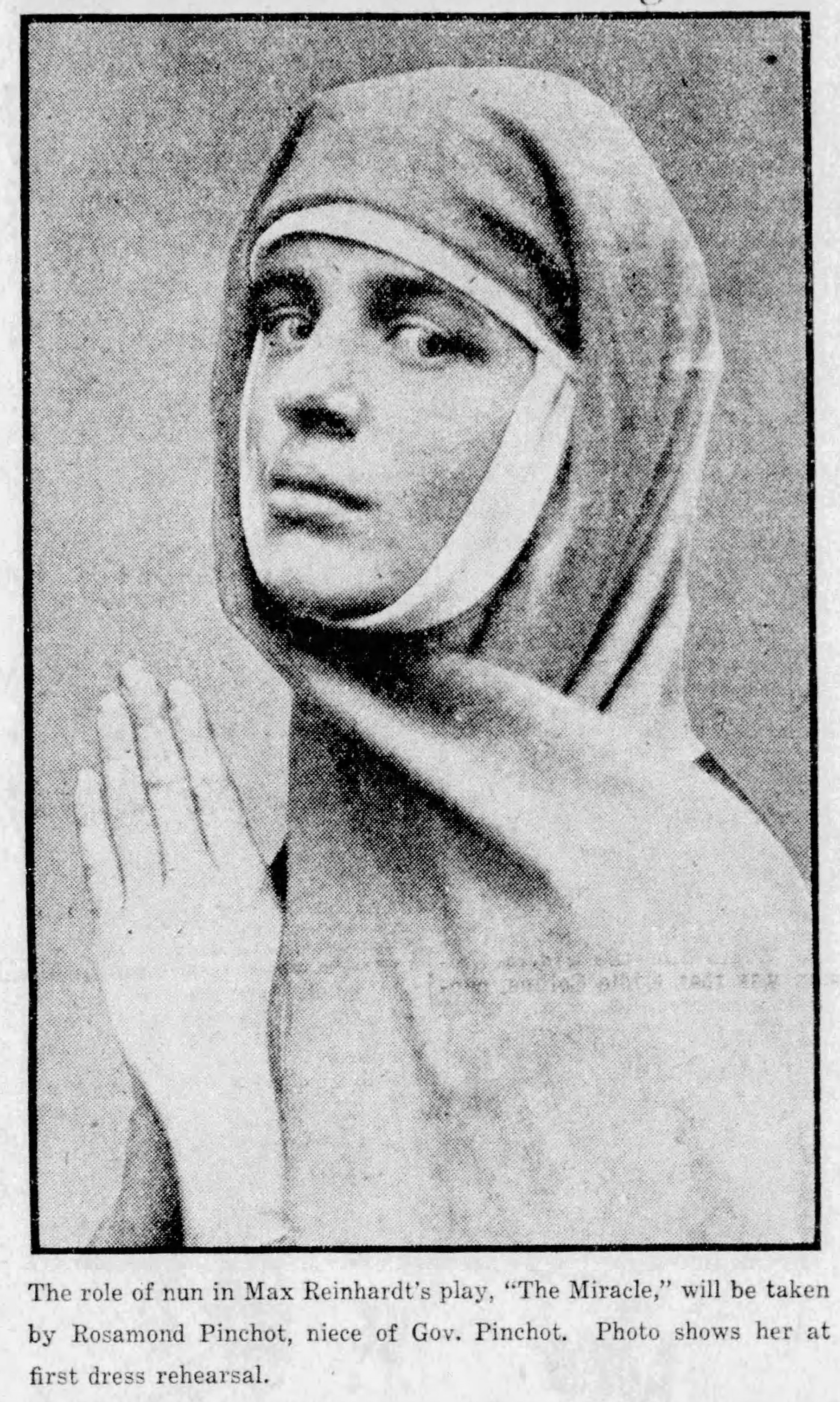
Newspaper clipping, December 3, 1923

At the age of nineteen, Pinchot was discovered by Max Reinhardt while traveling on an ocean liner with her mother. Reinhardt cast her as a nun who runs away from a convent in the Broadway production of Karl Vollmoller's The Miracle.

Pinchot's appearance in the play caused a sensation and led to her receiving considerable attention from the press who named her "the loveliest woman in America".

Reinhardt later cast her in productions of William Shakespeare's A Midsummer Night's Dream and Franz Werfel's The Eternal Road. She made her only film appearance in the 1935 adaptation of The Three Musketeers, as Queen Anne.

== Personal life ==
Pinchot married William "Big Bill" Gaston (who was previously married to Kay Francis), on January 26, 1928. The couple had two children, William Alexander Gaston and James Pinchot Gaston. In 1933, Pinchot and Gaston separated. They remained married but were estranged at the time of Pinchot's death.

== Death ==
On the morning of January 24, 1938, a cook found Pinchot's body in the front seat of her car parked in the garage of a rented estate in Old Brookville, New York. Her death was later determined to be caused by asphyxia due to carbon monoxide poisoning and was ruled a suicide. Pinchot left two suicide notes, the contents of which were never made public.

Pinchot's funeral was held at her mother's townhouse in New York City on January 26, 1938, her tenth wedding anniversary. She was buried in the Pinchot family plot in Milford Cemetery in Milford, Pennsylvania.

== Stage credits ==
Date	Production	Role
January 16 – June 1924	The Miracle	The Nun
May 31 – June 1926	Henry IV, Part 2	John of Lancaster
November 17 – December 1927	A Midsummer Night's Dream	Helena
December 7 – 1927	Jederman	Lady
December 20, 1927 – January 1928	Danton's Tod	Marion
October 6 – November 1936	St Helena	Countess Bertrand
January 7 – May 15, 1937	The Eternal Road	Bath-Sheba

== Filmography ==
Year	Title	Role	Role
1935	The Three Musketeers	Queen Anne	
