= Wiss, Janney, Elstner Associates, Inc. =

American architecture firm

- Type: Architects, Engineers, Materials Science
- Founded: 1956
- Founder: Jack R. Janney
- Headquarters: Northbrook, Illinois, U.S.
- Number of locations: 800+ employees in 30 locations throughout the United States and London.
- Area served: United States and various international locations
- Key people: William J. Nugent (CEO); Gary J. Klein (Senior Principal)
- Website: www.wje.com

Wiss, Janney, Elstner Associates, Inc. (WJE) is an American corporation of architects, engineers, and materials scientists specializing in the investigation, analysis, testing, and design of repairs for historic and contemporary buildings and structures. Founded in 1956, WJE is headquartered in Northbrook, Illinois, and has over 800 professionals across the United States. WJE personnel are specialized in architectural, structural, and civil engineering; materials conservation, chemistry and petrography, and testing and instrumentation.

== Services ==
Wiss, Janney, Elstner Associates, Inc. (WJE) offers a wide range of professional services in engineering, architecture, materials science, laboratory testing, field services, forensics, and design. These services support investigation, analysis, design, testing, troubleshooting, and evaluation for new and existing structures. According to the firm's official website, WJE's service offerings include:

=== Engineering ===
- Bridge engineering
- Construction engineering
- Fire protection and life safety
- Geotechnical and geological engineering
- Heavy movable structures
- Materials engineering
- Metallurgy and applied mechanics
- Seismic engineering
- Structural engineering

=== Architecture ===
- Architectural finishes and materials
- Building enclosures
- Building science
- Enclosure commissioning
- Historic preservation

=== Laboratory ===
- Materials evaluation and testing
- Product development, evaluation, and testing
- Research
- Structural load and fatigue testing

=== Field ===
- Building enclosure testing
- Condition evaluation
- Construction observation and troubleshooting
- Difficult access and drone survey
- Instrumentation and monitoring
- Nondestructive evaluation
- Structural load testing

=== Forensics ===
- Failure and damage investigation
- Litigation consulting

=== Design ===
- Design-build
- Design review
- Repair and rehabilitation
- Systems and components

As part of its services, WJE's multidisciplinary team applies technical expertise across the built environment to provide solutions for complex structural and material challenges.

== History ==
=== 20th century ===
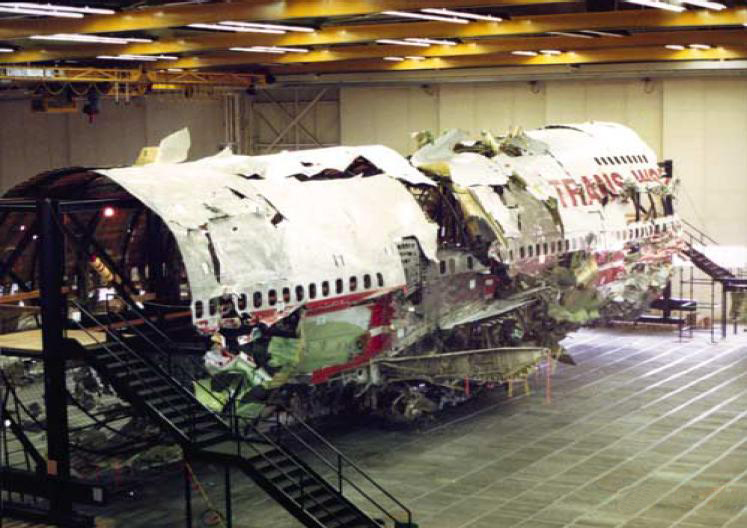
Reconstruction of TWA Flight 800 wreckage at the Naval Weapons Industrial Reserve Plant.

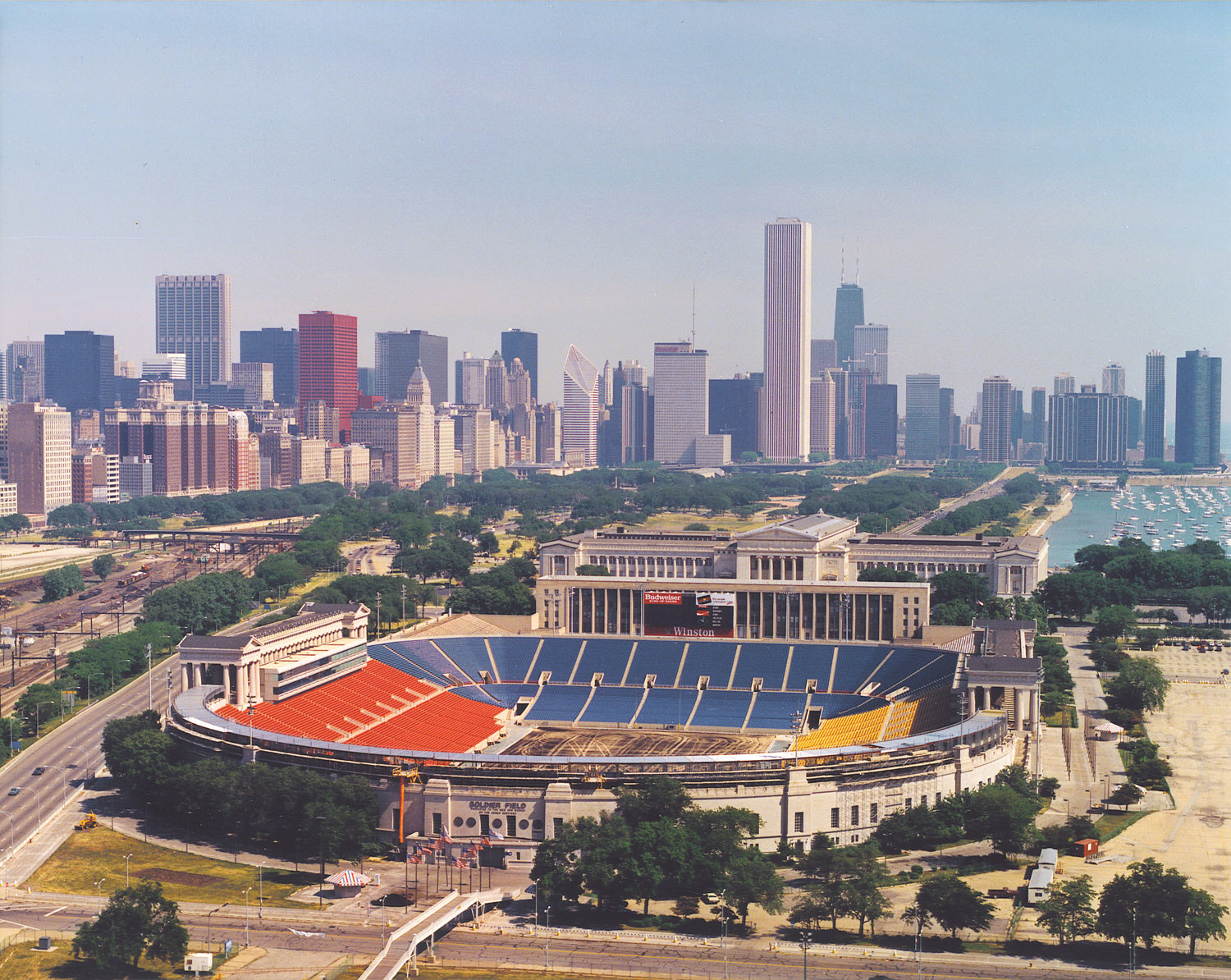
WJE has performed long-term routine condition assessment services on Soldier Field, home to the Chicago Bears, annually since 1970.

Jack R. Janney originally established WJE in 1956 as Janney and Associates. Earlier that year, President Dwight D. Eisenhower enacted the Federal-Aid Highway Act of 1956, authorizing the construction of over 40,000 miles of roads for the interstate highway system. Working for the Portland Cement Association (PCA), Janney was recognized for his knowledge of prestressed concrete by the Illinois State Toll Highway Authority and was offered a consulting position for a new construction project utilizing full scale load testing. During this time, Janney established his own firm with fellow engineer and neighbor Jack Wiss. In 1957, the company became Wiss and Janney Associates. In 1961, former PCA colleague Dick Elstner joined the company and it was renamed Wiss, Janney, Elstner Associates, Inc.

== Notable projects ==
=== 1960–1980 ===
- New York World's Fair – Queens, New York – Structural investigation and engineering consulting.
- U.S. Bureau of Mines – United States – Structural and materials evaluation.
- Lake Point Tower – Chicago, Illinois – Building enclosure evaluation.
- Soldier Field – Chicago, Illinois – Condition assessment and structural consulting.
- Woolworth Building – New York City, New York – Historic façade and preservation consulting.
- Willow Island cooling tower – West Virginia – Failure investigation and structural analysis.

=== 1981–1990 ===
- Kansas City Hyatt Regency – Kansas City, Missouri – Structural assessment and retrofit consulting.
- Rookery Building – Chicago, Illinois – Building enclosure and preservation consulting.
- Schoharie Creek Bridge – Schoharie, New York – Forensic structural investigation.
- Amoco Building – Chicago, Illinois – Façade condition evaluation.
- San Jacinto Monument – La Porte, Texas – Structural investigation and condition assessment.

=== 1991–2000 ===
- John F. Kennedy Center for the Performing Arts – Washington, D.C. – Enclosure consulting and structural evaluation.
- Seattle Kingdome – Seattle, Washington – Structural assessment and engineering consulting.
- Koror–Babeldaob Bridge – Palau – Bridge evaluation and structural consulting.
- TWA Flight 800 – Atlantic Ocean / New York – Forensic engineering investigation.
- Cape Hatteras Lighthouse – Buxton, North Carolina – Historic preservation and rehabilitation consulting.
- Alcatraz Cellhouse – San Francisco, California – Condition evaluation and preservation consulting.

=== 2001–2010 ===
- Hurricane Katrina – United States Gulf Coast – Post-disaster damage investigation and engineering consulting.
- Central Artery/Tunnel Project (Big Dig) – Boston, Massachusetts – Structural and building enclosure consulting.
- I-35W Mississippi River Bridge – Minneapolis, Minnesota – Bridge evaluation and forensic investigation.
- Perry's Victory and International Peace Memorial – Put-in-Bay, Ohio – Condition assessment and preservation consulting.
- American Museum of Natural History – New York City, New York – Façade assessment and enclosure consulting.
- New York Public Library – New York City, New York – Exterior restoration and building enclosure consulting.

=== 2011–2020 ===
- National September 11 Memorial – New York City, New York – Structural evaluation and design support.
- Washington Monument – United States – Condition evaluation and preservation consulting.
- Washington National Cathedral – Washington, D.C. – Structural assessment and preservation consulting.
- Minnesota State Capitol – Saint Paul, Minnesota – Façade restoration and engineering consulting.
- Gateway Arch – St. Louis, Missouri – Structural assessment and repair consulting.
- Miami-Dade County Courthouse – Miami, Florida – Building enclosure and condition evaluation.

=== 2021–present ===
- Old Cook County Hospital – Chicago, Illinois – Historic preservation and enclosure consulting.
- Old Chicago Post Office – Chicago, Illinois – Structural rehabilitation consulting.
- 30th Street Station – Philadelphia, Pennsylvania – Building envelope and condition assessment.
- Martin Luther King Jr. Memorial Library – Washington, D.C. – Historic preservation and adaptive reuse consulting.
- Champlain Towers South – Surfside, Florida – Structural investigation and forensic engineering.
- Sixth Street Viaduct – Los Angeles, California – Structural engineering and construction support.
- New York Life Building – New York City, New York – Historic preservation and roof and cornice repair consulting.
