= Mount Pinchot =

Mount Pinchot main refer to:

- Mount Pinchot (California), a mountain in the Sierra Nevada
- Mount Pinchot (Montana), a mountain in Glacier National Park, Montana
- Mount Pinchot (Oklahoma), a mountain in the Wichita Mountains, Oklahoma

== See also ==
- Pinchot (disambiguation)
