= Helene Maxwell Hooker =

American historian (1907-2006)

- Born: November 20, 1907; San Francisco, California, U.S.
- Died: 2006 (aged 98–99)
- Occupation: Historian
- Spouse: Edward Niles Hooker (m. 1940, divorced) Joseph Hillyer Brewer (m. 1958)
- Awards: Guggenheim Fellowship (1949)

Academic background
- Education: Santa Barbara State Teachers College (BA); Stanford University (MA); Johns Hopkins University (PhD)

Academic work
- Discipline: Political history
- Sub-discipline: Progressive Era politics
- Institutions: Queens College; University of California, Berkeley

Helene Maxwell Hooker (November 20, 1907 – 2006), later known as Helene Maxwell Brewer, was an American historian. She researched Progressive Era politics and was editor of Amos Pinchot's posthumous book History of the Progressive Party, 1912-1916 (1958). A 1949 Guggenheim Fellow, she worked as a professor at Queens College before moving to research positions at the University of California, Berkeley.

== Biography ==
She was born on November 20, 1907, in San Francisco, daughter of Hulda (née Anderson) and professor William Maxwell. She was raised in San Mateo, California, where she was a graduate of San Mateo High School.

In 1930, she obtained her BA from Santa Barbara State Teachers College, where her father worked as a professor. After working at the University of Washington as a teaching fellow in English (1931-1932), she studied at Bryn Mawr College (1932-1933) and obtained her MA at Stanford University in 1934. After a year as a research assistant in Columbia University (1938-1939), she got a PhD in English from Johns Hopkins University in 1940.

She briefly worked at Hollywood Quarterly as an assistant editor from 1945 to 1946. In 1952, she moved to Queens College and started teaching American literature. She worked as a researcher at the Bancroft Library and as an oral history interviewer at the Regional Oral History Office. She was a 1967-1968 Fulbright Scholar at Tsuda University.

She researched Progressive Era politics as her primary field, while also doing work in post-Civil War history. In 1949, she was awarded a Guggenheim Fellowship "for a study of reform and progressive movements in the Far West", as well as a biography on Progressive-era jurist Francis J. Heney. She edited History of the Progressive Party, 1912-1916, a book based on Amos Pinchot's unfinished drafts on the topic; it was released in 1958.

In 1940, she married in Las Vegas Edward Niles Hooker, an English professor and fellow Guggenheim Fellow; they remained together until sometime before 1951. On June 12, 1958, she married Joseph Hillyer Brewer, who was president of Olivet College from 1934 to 1943, in New York City. She was a friend of feminist and academic Fumi Takano, whom she met at Tsuda University.

She died in 2006. The Bancroft Library obtained her papers from the family of her friend Sarah Caldwell.

== Bibliography ==
- (as editor, by Amos Pinchot) History of the Progressive Party, 1912-1916 (1958)
