= Cord Meyer =

American CIA official and author (1920–2001)

Cord Meyer IV
- Born: November 10, 1920; Washington, D.C., U.S.
- Died: March 13, 2001 (aged 80); Washington, D.C., U.S.
- Burial place: Arlington National Cemetery; 38.8757075°N 77.0639668°W
- Known for: 1st President of United World Federalists
- Spouses: Mary Pinchot Meyer (m. 1945; div. 1958) Starke Patteson Anderson (m. 1966)
- Parents: Cord Meyer III (father); Katherine Blair Thaw (mother)
- Relatives: Cord Meyer II (grandfather); William Thaw Sr. (great-grandfather)

Cord Meyer IV (/ˈmaɪ.ər/; November 10, 1920 – March 13, 2001) was a war veteran, a world federalist, a CIA official and a writer. After serving in World War II as a Marine officer in the Pacific War, where he was both injured and decorated, he led the United World Federalists in the years after the war. Around 1949, he began working for the CIA, where he became a high-level operative, retiring in 1977. After retiring from intelligence work in 1977, Meyer wrote as a columnist and book author.

From 1945 to 1958, Meyer was married to Mary Pinchot, who was later romantically linked to President John F. Kennedy. Her murder in 1964, eleven months after Kennedy's assassination, remains unresolved.

== Early life ==
Meyer was the son of a wealthy New York family. His father, Cord Meyer III, was a diplomat and real estate developer; his mother, Katherine Blair Thaw, belonged to a Pennsylvania family that obtained its wealth in the coal business. His grandfather, Cord Meyer II, was a property developer and a chairman of the New York State Democratic Committee.

He was educated at St. Paul's School, New Hampshire, and attended Yale University, where he was a member of the Scroll and Key society, and as a senior was awarded the Alpheus Henry Snow Prize. He was a member of the Harvard Society of Fellows. After graduating in 1942, he joined the 22nd Marine Regiment and fought in the Pacific War; he took part in the Battle of Eniwetok, and in the Battle of Guam as platoon leader, losing his left eye in a grenade attack. He became a first lieutenant and was awarded the Bronze Star Medal. He shared his war experiences, writing for The Atlantic Monthly. Meyer's twin brother, Quentin, was killed at Okinawa.

== United World Federalists, Inc. ==
He was an aide of Harold Stassen to the 1945 San Francisco United Nations Conference on International Organization. In 1947, he was elected president of the United World Federalists (UWF), the organization he helped to fund. In year 1948, Cord was invited to attend the meeting of Emergency Committee of Atomic Scientists (ECAS) and he met Albert Einstein, Leo Szilard and many of the other leading nuclear physicists. It was when Albert Einstein joined UWF and showed his support and also assisted UEF in fundraising on numerous occasions. In 1949, Cord resigned and was succeeded by Alan Cranston.

== CIA career ==
Around 1949, Meyer started working for the Central Intelligence Agency, joining the organization in 1951 at the invitation of Allen Dulles. At first he worked at the Office of Policy Coordination under former OSS man, Frank Wisner. In 1953, Meyer came under attack by the Federal Bureau of Investigation (FBI), which claimed he was a security risk for having once stood at the same podium of a "notorious leftist", and refused to give him a security clearance. An internal CIA inquiry summarily dismissed the claims.

According to Deborah Davis in her 1979 book Katharine the Great, Meyer became the "principal operative" of Operation Mockingbird, an alleged plan to secretly influence domestic and foreign media. Meyer befriended James Angleton, who in 1954 became the CIA's counter-intelligence chief. From 1954 until 1962, Meyer led the agency's International Organizations Division. Meyer headed the Covert Action Staff of the Directorate of Plans from 1962.

From 1967 to 1973, Meyer was assistant deputy director of plans under Thomas Karamessines, and from 1973 to 1976 was CIA station chief in London.

Some insiders incorrectly suspected that Meyer was Deep Throat, a key informant in the Watergate Scandal whose identity was a mystery for more than 30 years.

=== Alleged involvement in JFK assassination ===
After the death of former CIA agent and Watergate figure E. Howard Hunt in 2007, Saint John Hunt and David Hunt revealed that their father had recorded several claims about himself and others being involved in a conspiracy to assassinate John F. Kennedy. In the April 5, 2007 issue of Rolling Stone, Saint John Hunt detailed a number of individuals implicated by his father including Meyer, as well as Lyndon B. Johnson, David Sánchez Morales, David Phillips, Frank Sturgis, an assassin, he termed "French gunman grassy knoll" who many presume was Lucien Sarti, and William Harvey. The two sons alleged that their father cut the information from his memoirs, "American Spy: My Secret History in the CIA, Watergate and Beyond", to avoid possible perjury charges. According to Hunt's widow and other children, the two sons took advantage of Hunt's loss of lucidity by coaching and exploiting him for financial gain. The Los Angeles Times said they examined the materials offered by the sons to support the story and found them to be "inconclusive".

== Personal life ==
On April 19, 1945, Meyer married Mary Eno Pinchot, the second daughter of Amos Pinchot and Ruth Pickering Pinchot, in her mother's Park Avenue home in New York City. On 18 December 1956, Meyer's nine-year-old son, Michael (born in 1947), was hit by a car and killed. Meyer had two surviving sons, Quentin, born in November 1945, and Mark, born in 1950. Meyer and his wife Mary divorced in 1958. On 12 October 1964, his former wife Mary was shot dead by an unknown assailant alongside the Chesapeake and Ohio Canal. Her sister and brother-in-law Benjamin C. Bradlee, later the executive editor of The Washington Post, caught James Angleton breaking into Pinchot's residence. Angleton apparently was looking for Mary Meyer's diary that allegedly contained details of her love affair with John F. Kennedy, the recently assassinated U.S. President.

In 1966, Meyer married Starke Patteson Anderson.

== Later years ==
He retired from the CIA in 1977. Following retirement, Meyer became a syndicated columnist and wrote several books, including an autobiography.

== Books ==
- Peace or Anarchy. Boston: Little, Brown and Company (1948).
- The Search of Security. World Government House (1947). Pamphlet, 8 pages.
- Facing Reality: From World Federalism to the CIA. New York: Harper & Row (1980). ISBN 978-0060130329.

== Death ==
Meyer died of lymphoma on March 13, 2001.

== Viral false claims ==
A photo of his meeting with Albert Einstein in 1948 has been widely circulated on the internet and social media, with the false claims of Einstein being with his therapist.

== See also ==
- United World Federalists, Inc. (UWF)
- Emergency Committee of Atomic Scientists (ECAS)
