= Jack R. Janney =

American engineer (1924–2006)

- Born: June 17, 1924; Alamosa, Colorado, U.S.
- Died: October 9, 2006 (aged 82)
- Education: University of Colorado at Boulder, Bachelor of Science, Architectural Engineering, 1948; Master of Science, Structural Engineering, 1950
- Engineering career
- Discipline: Structural engineer
- Institutions: American Society of Civil Engineers (ASCE), National Society of Professional Engineers (NSPE), The American Society for Testing and Materials, Prestressed Concrete Institute (PCI)
- Projects: Load tests on three buildings for the 1964 New York World's Fair, blast monitoring for the United States Bureau of Mines, wind tunnel study of Lake Point Tower in Chicago, Illinois
- Awards: "ENR's 125 Years, Top 125 Top People" (1999); PCI Top 50 "Titans" of the precast/prestressed concrete industry (2004); University of Colorado Distinguished Engineering Alumnus Award (2000); John F. Parmer Award from the Structural Engineers Association of Illinois (2000); The Forensic Engineer of the Year Award from the Technical Council on Forensic Engineering (1991);

Jack Raymond Janney (June 17, 1924 – October 9, 2006), born in Alamosa, Colorado, was a U.S. structural engineer and an innovator in the understanding of structural behavior and a recognized leader in the investigation of structural collapses. Janney's love of mathematics and science spurred his decision to become an engineer, and in 1942, he enrolled in the College of Engineering at the University of Colorado at Boulder. After only one semester, Janney left college and enlisted in the Navy where he became a decorated pilot during World War II.

After the war, Janney returned to the University of Colorado at Boulder where he earned his bachelor's degree in architectural engineering in 1948 and his master's degree in structural engineering in 1950. Janney's graduate-school thesis on prestressed concrete was recognized as one of the first comprehensive papers written on the subject in the United States. Subsequently, the Portland Cement Association (PCA) hired Janney to conduct research on prestressed concrete at its newly constructed laboratories in Skokie, Illinois, where he worked from 1950 to 1956. During his time with the Portland Cement Association Janney published a journal entitled "Nature of Bond in Pre-Tensioned Prestressed Concrete," which displayed results from numerous experiments he performed to determine the effectiveness of prestressed concrete. One of the experiments Janney performed on prestressed concrete was called the "Prism Test." Through the "Prism Test," Janney gained a lot of new and valuable knowledge on the effects of prestressed concrete and he was able to develop superior methods of creating very strong prestressed concrete for engineering during that time period.

In 1956, Janney started his own consulting engineering firm that would eventually become Wiss, Janney, Elstner Associates, Inc. (WJE). The company today employs 470 professionals in nineteen offices nationwide. Janney's first project as a consulting engineer was on behalf of the Illinois State Toll Highway Authority, overseeing the manufacturing of precast, prestressed concrete girders for bridges for the tollway.

In WJE's early years, Janney pioneered the use of three-dimensional scale models for determining the distribution of strains and stresses in structures, before the advent of computers and structural analysis programs. Janney performed more than 60 scale-model studies from 1958 to 1969 on many important structures, including Chicago's First National Bank, the Kodak Pavilion at the 1964 New York World's Fair, and the hyperbolic paraboloid roof for TWA's maintenance hangar in Kansas City, Missouri. WJE needed to design, construct, and test a scale model of the roof for the TWA Maintenance Hangar due to its unusual geometry. This model provided an enormous challenge due to the size and complexity required to design the model.

During his 50-plus year career, Janney investigated upwards of 500 structural collapses and more than 4,000 cases of structural distress. Projects include the Bailey's Crossroads Apartments collapse near Washington, DC, in 1973, the cooling-tower scaffolding failure at the Willow Island Nuclear Plant in West Virginia in 1976, the Civic Center Coliseum collapse in Hartford, Connecticut, in 1978; and the Rosemont Horizon collapse near Chicago, Illinois, in 1981.

A member of numerous professional organizations, Janney served many years on the Research Council on the Performance of Structures for the American Society of Civil Engineers (ASCE). He was also an original member of the joint ASCE/American Concrete Institute (ACI) committee that formulated provisions for prestressed concrete in the ACI Building Code.

Janney was also active in the Prestressed Concrete Institute (PCI), the National Society of Professional Engineers (NSPE) and the American Society for Testing and Materials (ASTM), serving as chair of a number of committees in each. He served on the Board of Directors for both ACI and PCI as well. Janney's innovative book, Guide to Investigation of Structural Failure (ASCE Press 1979), remains a landmark text in the industry.

A recipient of many professional honors throughout his life, Janney received the Distinguished Engineering Alumnus Award from the University of Colorado in 1985, the John F. Parmer Award from the Structural Engineers Association of Illinois in 2000, the Forensic Engineer of the Year Award from the Technical Council on Forensic Engineering in 1991, and Civil Engineer of the Year Award from the Illinois Section of ASCE in 1979. In 1991, Janney was also elevated to Honorary Member status in ASCE. Janney's early work in precast concrete also earned him recognition as one of 50 "Titans" of the precast/prestressed concrete industry at the 50th PCI anniversary conference in 2004.

Engineering News-Record (ENR) twice honored Janney with its "Those Who Made Marks" designation in 1967, for his full-scale testing (to failure) of several buildings at the New York World's Fair and in 1982 for innovations employed in the rehabilitation of Chicago's Soldier Field. In 1999 as part of its 125th anniversary, ENR selected Mr. Janney as one of its "125 Top People of the Past 125 Years" in the construction industry.

Janney retired as President of WJE and returned to his native Colorado in 1980. He remained an active member on WJE's Board of Directors until his death in 2006.
