= Nina Burleigh =

American writer and investigative journalist

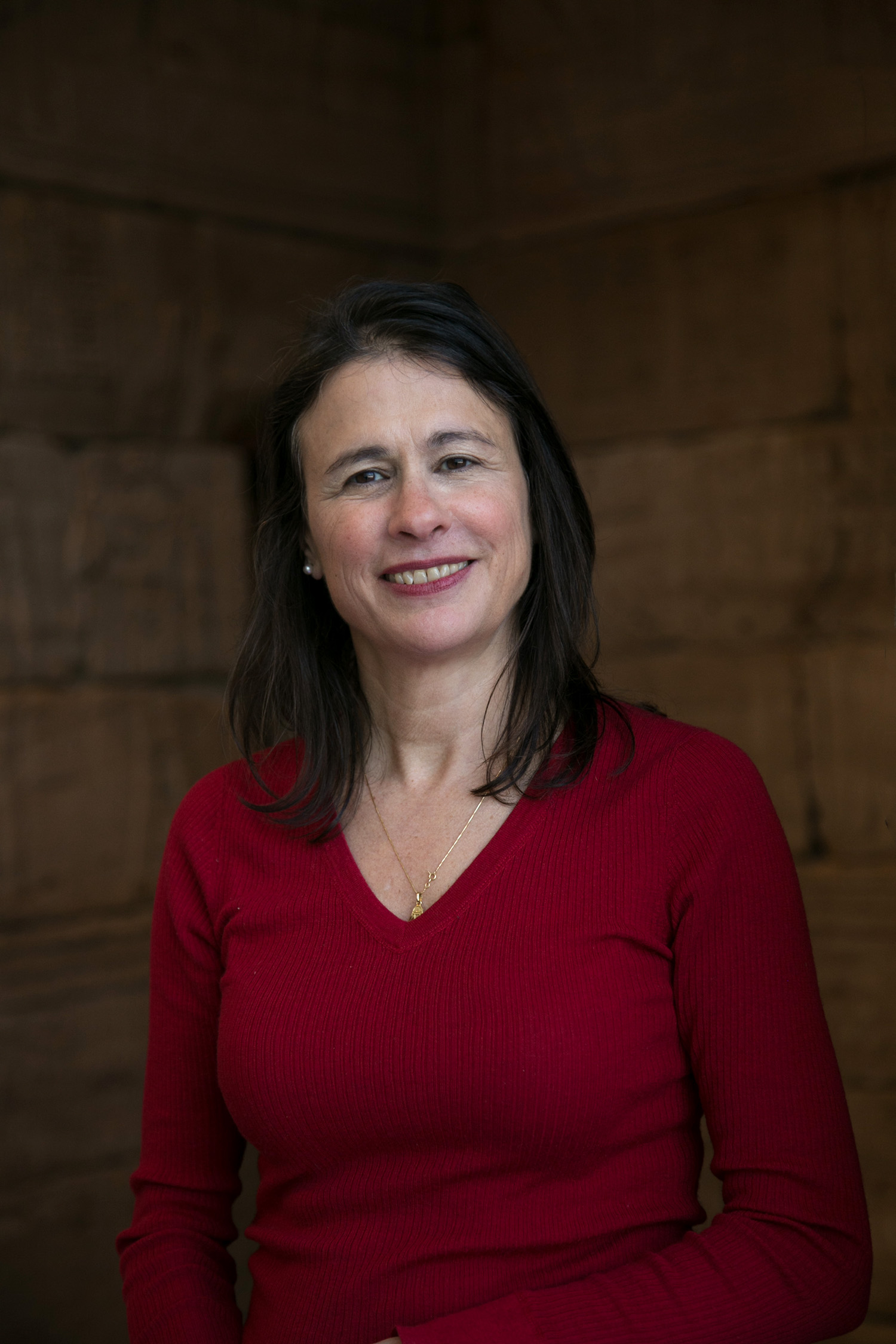
- Born: Chicago, Illinois, U.S.
- Education: MacMurray College (BA); Sangamon State University (MA); University of Chicago (MA)
- Occupations: Writer, investigative journalist
- Spouse: Erik Freeland
- Children: 2
- Website: www.ninaburleigh.com

Nina D. Burleigh is an American writer and investigative journalist. She writes books, articles, essays and reviews. Burleigh is a supporter of secular liberalism, and is known for her interest in issues of women's rights.

== Early life ==
Burleigh grew up in San Francisco, before moving to Baghdad, and an Amish area of Michigan. Burleigh stated that her family had "rejected institutional religion" by the time she grew up in the 1970s. "No baptism, no family Bible recording the births, deaths and marriages. My grandfather actively despised churches".

Burleigh earned a bachelor's degree in English from MacMurray College, a master's in English from the University of Chicago, and a master's degree in Public Affairs Reporting from Sangamon State University in 1984.

== Career ==
From January 2015 to January 2020, Burleigh was the National Politics Correspondent for Newsweek. Burleigh covered the White House for Time in the 1990s.

In the 2000s, Burleigh was a staff writer at People magazine, covering human interest stories. She wrote "The Bombshell" column for the New York Observer, and was a contributing editor to Elle. She has contributed to numerous magazines and newspapers, including Time magazine, The New York Times, The New Yorker, The Washington Post, Rolling Stone, and The Guardian and websites such as Slate magazine, TomPaine.com, AlterNet, Powell's Salon.com, and GEN/Medium. She is an occasional blogger at The Huffington Post. She was an adjunct professor of journalism at Columbia University, and a guest lecturer at the University of Agder.

=== Middle East ===
Burleigh worked in the Middle East for many years. Topics she covered included the politics of the Israeli settlements for Time Magazine; the emerging effect of Islamists on women in the wake of the Arab Spring for Slate and Time; and the politics and science of biblical archaeology in Israel for the book Unholy Business and for the Los Angeles Times. She spent several years working on a book about biblical archaeology and forgery in Israel, which was published in 2009 as Unholy Business: A True Tale of Faith, Greed and Forgery in the Holy Land.

=== Amanda Knox case and Italy ===
In June 2009, Burleigh and her family moved to the Italian city of Perugia, where Amanda Knox was being tried on a murder charge, to write a book. Burleigh intended the story to be an exploration of young women's experiences and media portrayal in the modern world. The book was published in 2011 as The Fatal Gift of Beauty: The Trials of Amanda Knox.

=== Melania Trump ===
In January 2019, the London Daily Telegraph apologized and paid "substantial damages" for publishing an article written by Burleigh. The article, titled "The Mystery of Melania", was alleged to contain numerous fallacies. "[Melania] Trump often refers to opportunists out to advance themselves by disparaging her name and image", Stephanie Grisham, Ms. Trump's then-communications director, said in a statement to CNN. "She will not sit by as people and media outlets make up lies and false assertions in a race for ratings or to sell tabloid headlines".

Burleigh, however, stood by the article in her subsequent book The Golden Handcuffs: The Secret History of Trump’s Women. On January 30, 2019, Burleigh's lawyers threatened the Telegraph parent company TMG with a lawsuit:

In fact, it is TMG's Apology that is false. It appears that fear of Mrs Trump's lawyer Mr Harder, the "Gawker slayer", caused TMG to capitulate abjectly in the face of his letter without regard to normal journalistic principles, at the cost of Ms Burleigh's personal and professional reputation. In reality, the statements in the Article that Mrs Trump complained about were (1) well-sourced, (2) professionally fact checked before publication, (3) extensively reviewed by a lawyer retained by Gallery, (4) given proper and prudent caveats in the Article, and (5) benign. TMG had nothing to apologise for, and both the fact that it did so, and the particularly lurid way it abandoned the Article, have turned Ms Burleigh into an international poster girl for "fake news".

— McAllister Olivarius, legal representatives for Burleigh, Telegraph Claim Letter

== Personal life ==
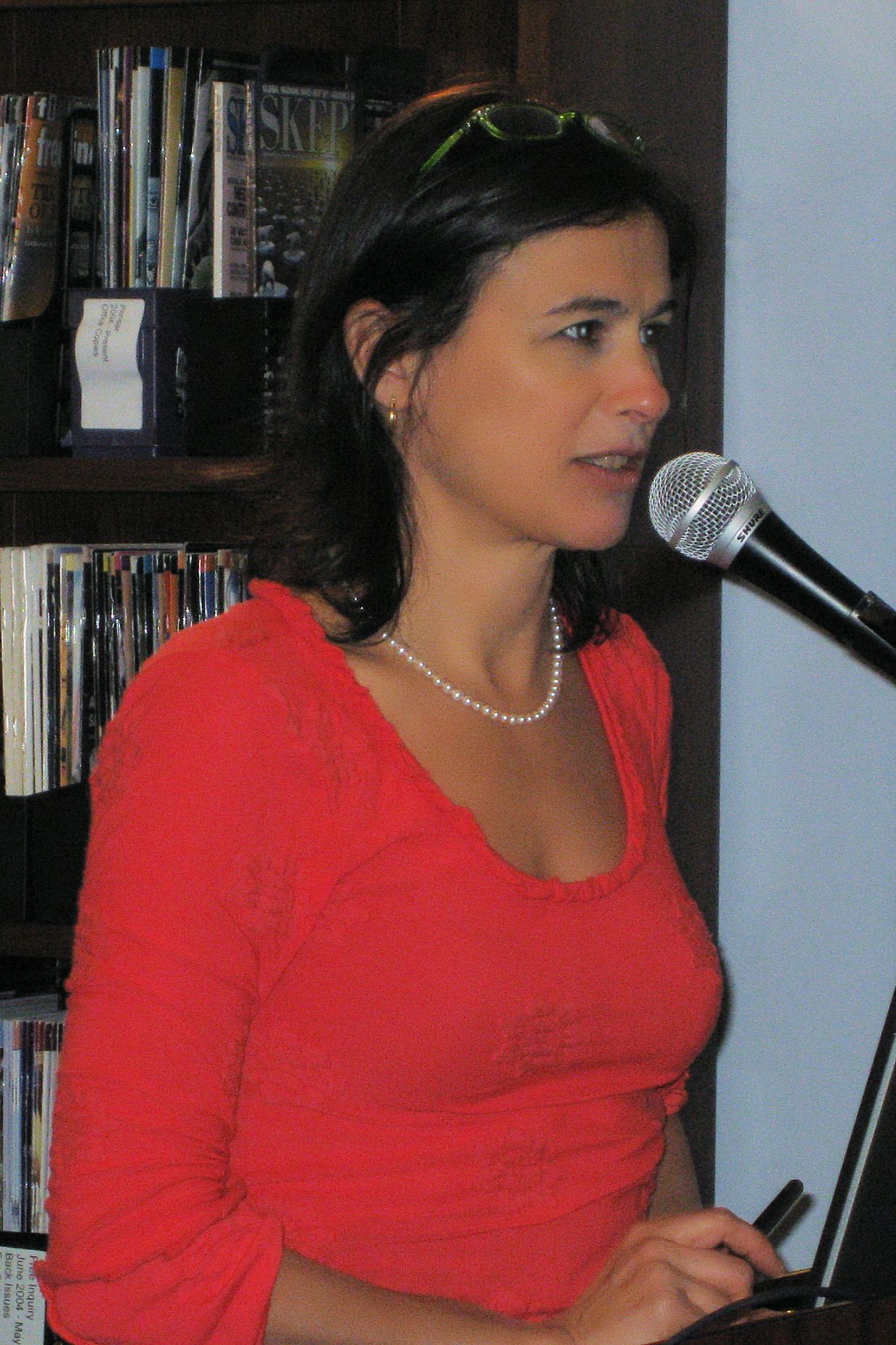
Burleigh speaking at CFI DC Voices of Reason, December 14, 2008

In 1999, Burleigh married Erik Freeland, a freelance photojournalist. The couple live with their two children in New York City. She is the daughter of author Robert Burleigh.

== List of works ==
=== Books ===
- A Very Private Woman: The Life and Unsolved Murder of Mary Meyer (1998): about Mary Pinchot Meyer ISBN 978-0553380514
- The Stranger and the Statesman: James Smithson, John Quincy Adams and the Making of America's Greatest Museum (2003) HarperCollins ISBN 0-06-000241-7
- Mirage: Napoleon's Scientists and the Unveiling of Egypt (2008) HarperCollins ISBN 978-0060597689 about Napoleon's invasion of Egypt. Selected by The New York Times as an editors' choice and by Delta Kappa Gamma Society International for the 2008 Educator's Award.
- Unholy Business: A True Tale of Faith, Greed and Forgery in the Holy Land (2008) HarperCollins ISBN 0061458457 about the James Ossuary. Burleigh has lectured on Unholy Business at the Oriental Institute, Chicago.
- The Fatal Gift of Beauty: The Trials of Amanda Knox (2012) Broadway Books ISBN 978-0307588593
- Golden Handcuffs: The Secret History of Trump's Women (October 2018) Gallery Books ISBN 978-1501180200. Reprinted as The Trump Women: Part of the Deal in 2020.
- Virus: Vaccinations, the CDC, and the Hijacking of America's Response to the Pandemic (2021) Seven Stories Press ISBN 978-1644211809
- Zero Visibility Possible (2024) Four Sticks Press ISBN 979-8890793041

=== Television ===
- 2021 Epstein's Shadow: Ghislaine Maxwell: executive producer of this three-part documentary about Ghislaine Maxwell (she is also in the cast, playing herself).
