= Mary Pinchot Meyer =

American socialite and painter (1920–1964)

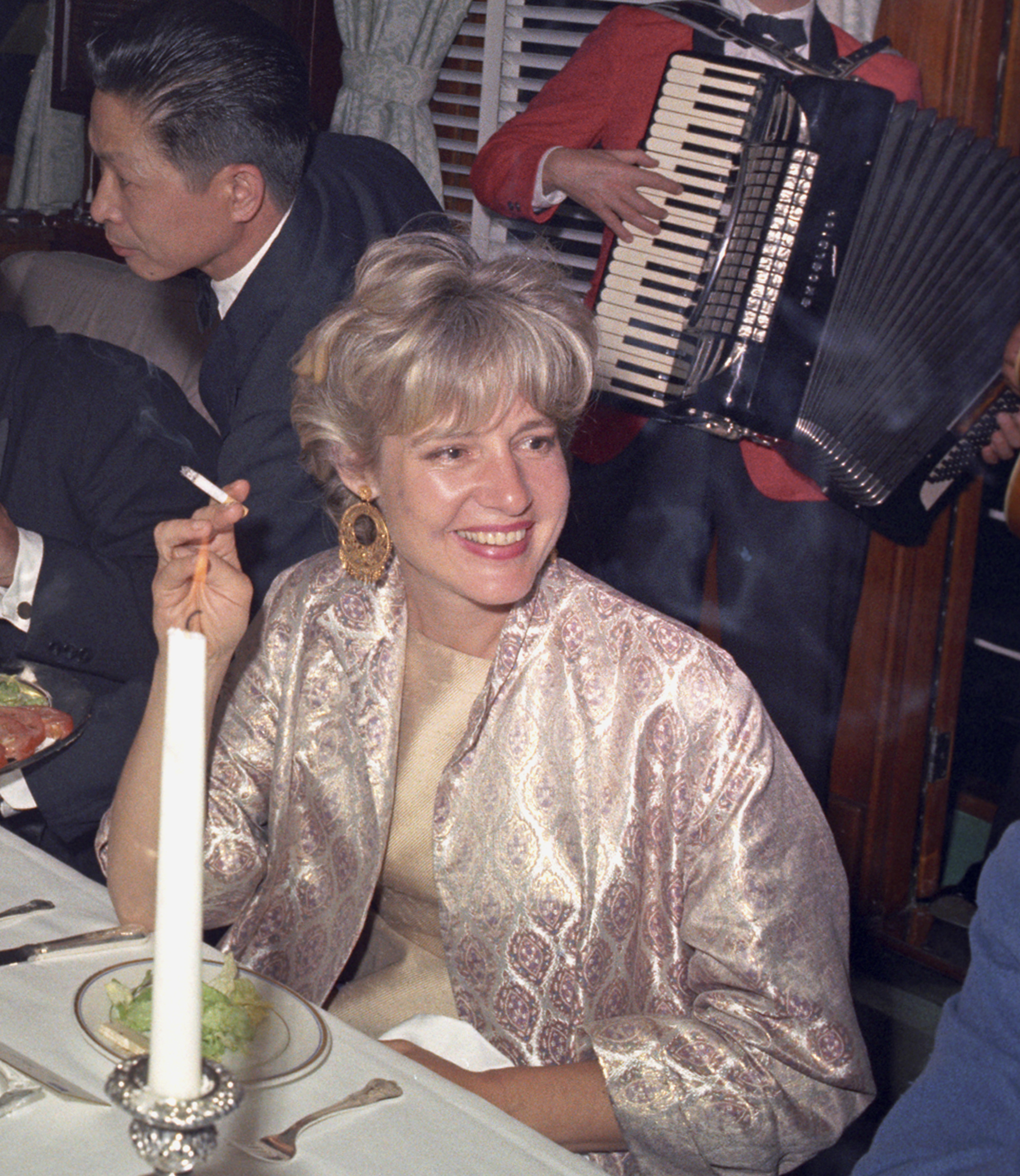
- Mary Pinchot Meyer at John F. Kennedy's 46th birthday party on the presidential yacht Sequoia
- Born: Mary Eno Pinchot; October 14, 1920; New York City, New York, US
- Died: October 12, 1964 (aged 43); Georgetown, Washington, D.C., US
- Cause of death: Homicide
- Resting place: Milford Cemetery, Pike County, Pennsylvania, US
- Education: Brearley School
- Alma mater: Vassar College
- Occupation: Painter
- Spouse: Cord Meyer (m. 1945; div. 1958)
- Children: 4
- Parent(s): Amos Pinchot; Ruth Pickering Pinchot
- Relatives: Gifford Pinchot (uncle); Rosamond Pinchot (half-sister); Antoinette Pinchot Bradlee (sister)

Mary Eno Pinchot Meyer (/ˈmaɪ.ər/; October 14, 1920 – October 12, 1964) was an American painter who lived in Washington D.C. She was married to CIA official Cord Meyer from 1945 to 1958 and became involved romantically with President John F. Kennedy after her divorce from Meyer.

Meyer was murdered on the Chesapeake & Ohio Canal towpath in Washington, D.C., on October 12, 1964. A suspect, Ray Crump Jr., was arrested and charged with her murder but was acquitted. Beginning in 1976, Meyer's life, her relationship with Kennedy, and her murder became the subjects of numerous articles and books, including a full-length biography by journalist Nina Burleigh.

== Early life ==
Mary Eno Pinchot was born in New York City, the older of two daughters of Amos and Ruth (née Pickering) Pinchot. Amos Pinchot was a wealthy lawyer and a key figure in the Progressive Party who had helped fund the socialist magazine The Masses. Her mother Ruth was Pinchot's second wife and was a journalist who wrote for such magazines as The Nation and The New Republic. Mary was also the niece of Gifford Pinchot, a noted conservationist and two-time Governor of Pennsylvania. Pinchot and her younger sister Antoinette (nicknamed "Tony") were raised at the family's Grey Towers home in Milford, Pennsylvania. As a child, Pinchot met such liberal intellectual figures as Mabel Dodge, Louis Brandeis, Robert M. La Follette, Sr., and Harold L. Ickes. She attended The Brearley School and Vassar College, where she became interested in Communism. She started dating William Attwood in 1935 and, while with him at a dance held at the Choate School, first met John F. Kennedy.

After her graduation from Vassar in 1942, Meyer became a journalist, writing for the United Press and Mademoiselle. As a pacifist and member of the American Labor Party, she came under scrutiny by the Federal Bureau of Investigation.

== Marriage ==
Pinchot met Cord Meyer in 1944 when he was a Marine Corps lieutenant who had lost his left eye because of shrapnel injuries received in combat. The two had similar pacifist views and beliefs in world government, and married on April 19, 1945. That spring they both attended the UN Conference on International Organization in San Francisco, during which the United Nations was founded, Cord as an aide of Harold Stassen and Pinchot as a reporter for a newspaper syndication service. She later worked for a time as an editor for Atlantic Monthly. Their oldest child, Quentin, was born in November 1945, followed by Michael in 1947, after which Pinchot became a homemaker, although she attended classes at the Art Students League of New York.

Cord Meyer became president of the United World Federalists in May 1947 and its membership doubled. Mary Meyer wrote for the organization's journal. In 1950, their third child, Mark, was born and they moved to Cambridge, Massachusetts. Meanwhile, her husband began to re-evaluate his notions of world government as members of the Communist Party USA infiltrated the international organizations he had founded. In 1951, Cord joined the Central Intelligence Agency after being recruited by Allen Dulles.

With her husband's CIA appointment, they moved to Washington, D.C., and became highly visible members of Georgetown society. Their acquaintances included Joseph Alsop, Katharine Graham, Clark Clifford, and Washington Post reporter James Truitt and his wife, noted artist Anne Truitt. Their social circle also included CIA-affiliated people such as Richard M. Bissell, Jr., high-ranking counter-intelligence official James Angleton, and Mary and Frank Wisner, Meyer's boss at the CIA.

In 1953, Senator Joseph McCarthy publicly accused Cord Meyer of being a Communist. The Federal Bureau of Investigation was reported to have looked into Mary's political past. Allen Dulles and Frank Wisner aggressively defended Meyer, and he remained with the CIA. However, by early 1954, Cord Meyer had become unhappy with his CIA career. He used contacts from his covert operations in Operation Mockingbird to approach several New York publishers for a job, but was rebuffed.

In the summer of 1954, John F. Kennedy and his wife Jackie Kennedy bought the house in McLean, Virginia next door to the Meyers'; at some point Meyer and Jackie Kennedy became acquainted. Eventually, after both had moved back to Georgetown, "they went on walks together." By the end of 1954, Cord Meyer was still with the CIA and often in Europe, running Radio Free Europe, Radio Liberty, and managing millions of dollars of U.S. government funds worldwide to support progressive-seeming foundations and organizations opposing the Soviet Union.

One of Meyer's close friends was a fellow Vassar alumna, Cicely d'Autremont, who married James Angleton. In 1955, Meyer's sister Antoinette married Ben Bradlee, who was then Washington bureau chief of Newsweek. On December 18, 1956, the Meyers' middle son Michael, aged nine, was hit by a car near their house and died. Although this tragedy brought Mary and Cord Meyer closer for a time, Mary filed for divorce in 1958.

== Relationship with Kennedy ==
After the divorce, Meyer and her two surviving sons moved to Georgetown. She began painting again in a converted garage studio at the home of her sister Tony and Tony's husband, Ben Bradlee. She also started a close relationship with abstract-minimalist painter Kenneth Noland and became friendly with Robert F. Kennedy, who had purchased his brother's house, Hickory Hill, in 1957. Nina Burleigh, in her book A Very Private Woman, writes that after the divorce Meyer became "a well-bred ingenue out looking for fun and getting in trouble along the way."

Counter-intelligence official James Angleton told Joan Bross, the wife of John Bross, a high-ranking CIA official, that he had begun tapping Meyer's telephone after she left her husband. Angleton often visited her Georgetown home and took her sons on fishing outings. Meyer visited John F. Kennedy at the White House in October 1961; their relationship became sexually intimate. Meyer told Anne and James Truitt that she was keeping a diary.

More than ten years after Meyer's death, rumors of her affair with Kennedy began to circulate. In 1976, they were confirmed first by the National Enquirer, then by the Washington Post. Nineteen years later, Post editor Ben Bradlee went into great detail about his sister-in-law Meyer's life and murder in his autobiography A Good Life.

In Timothy Leary's 1983 memoir titled Flashbacks: A Personal and Cultural History of an Era, he claimed to have known Meyer personally, and said she had influenced Kennedy's "views on nuclear disarmament and rapprochement with Cuba." In an interview with Nina Burleigh, Kennedy aide Myer Feldman said, "I think he might have thought more of her than some of the other women and discussed things that were on his mind, not just social gossip." Burleigh wrote, "Mary might actually have been a force for peace during some of the most frightening years of the Cold War ..."

In a 2008 interview with author Peter Janney for his book Mary's Mosaic, journalist and Kennedy intimate Charles Bartlett emphasized the serious nature of Meyer's romance with the late president, stating, "That was a dangerous relationship. Jack was in love with Mary Meyer. He was certainly smitten with her, he was heavily smitten. He was very frank with me about it." Meyer was a guest at the intimate party hosted by Jacqueline Kennedy in honor of President Kennedy aboard the yacht Sequoia on his 46th and last birthday celebration, May 29, 1963.

In October 1963, one month before his assassination, Kennedy wrote a letter to Mary Pinchot Meyer, imploring her to join him for a tryst. The unsent letter, written on White House stationery and retained by Kennedy's personal secretary Evelyn Lincoln, sold in June 2016 at auction for just under $89,000. The letter reads: "Why don't you leave suburbia for once—come and see me—either here—or at the Cape next week or in Boston the 19th. I know it is unwise, irrational, and that you may hate it—on the other hand you may not—and I will love it. You say that it is good for me not to get what I want. After all of these years—you should give me a more loving answer than that. Why don't you just say yes." The letter is signed "J."

== Murder and investigation ==
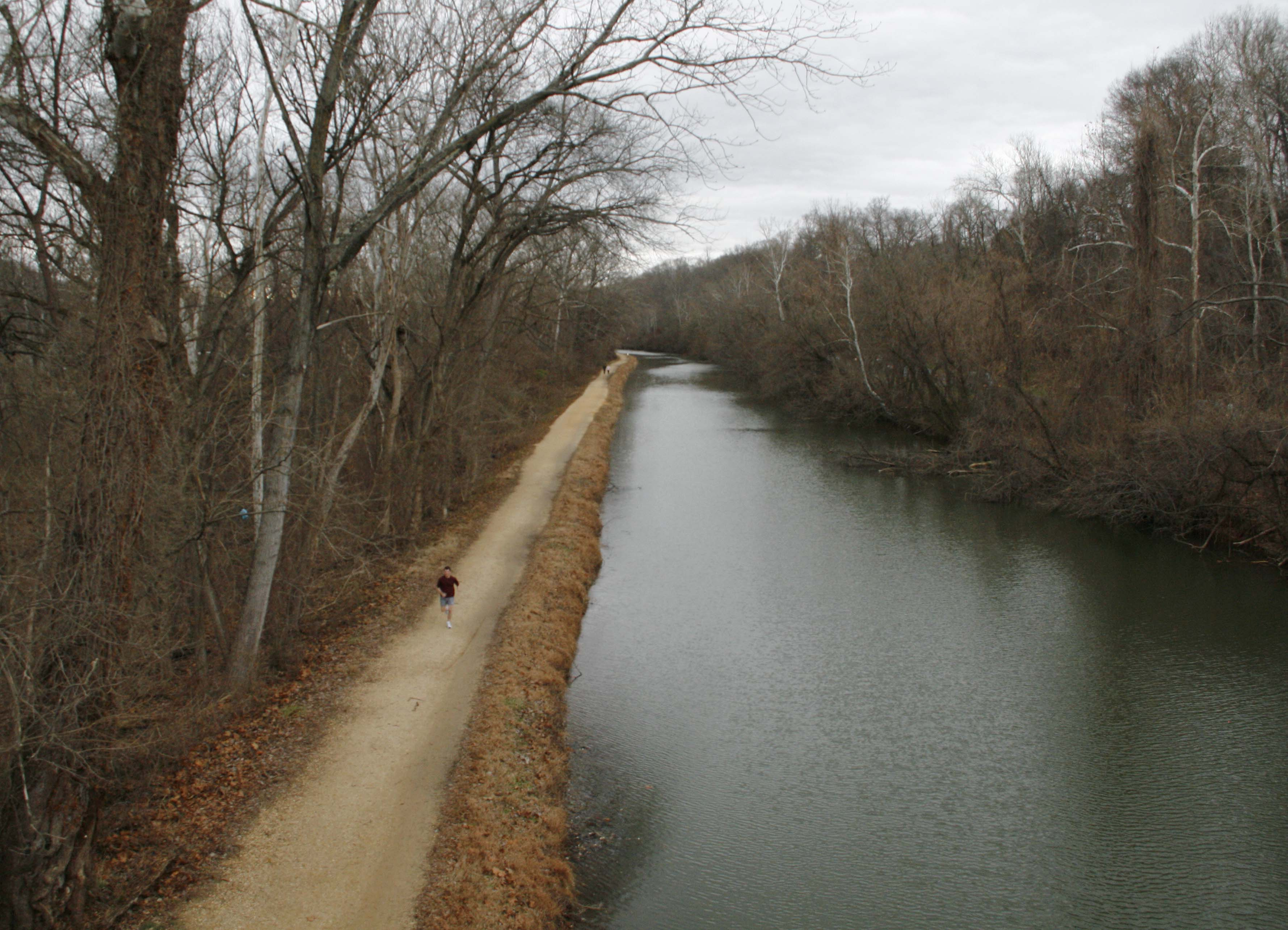
C & O Canal from Chain Bridge at the base of the Palisades, near Meyer's place of death

On October 12, 1964, Meyer finished a painting, then went for her customary daily walk along the Chesapeake and Ohio Canal towpath in Georgetown. Mechanic Henry Wiggins was trying to fix a car on Canal Road and heard a woman cry out, "Someone help me, someone help me." Wiggins heard two gunshots and a woman squeal "ouch" and ran to a low wall looking upon the path where he saw "a black man in a light jacket, dark slacks, and a dark cap standing over the body of a white woman."

Meyer's body had two bullet wounds, one in the left temple and one in the back. An FBI forensic expert testified at trial that "dark haloes on the skin around both entry wounds suggested they had been fired at close range, possibly point blank". The precision, placement and instantaneous lethality of the wounds suggested to the District of Columbia medical examiner that the killer was highly trained in the use of firearms.

Approximately forty minutes after the murder, Washington, D.C., police detective John Warner spotted a black man named Ray Crump about a quarter of a mile from the murder scene. Crump wasn't running; "He was walking," Detective Warner testified at the murder trial. Crump was arrested at 1:15 pm near the murder scene, based on car mechanic Wiggins' statement to police that Crump was the man he had seen standing over the victim's body as well as Crump's inability to give police a coherent explanation for his presence in the area. Crump's clothes were wet and there were scratches on his hands. Crump gave different stories to police, first claiming he'd entered the canal to recover a lost fishing pole and subsequently claiming he'd fallen into the canal after drinking beer. Police later found Crump's jacket and hat in the river, while the fishing pole was discovered in his home. The day after the murder, a second witness, Army Lt. William L. Mitchell, came forward and told police that when jogging on the towpath the preceding day, he had seen a black man trailing a white woman he believed was Meyer. Mitchell's description of the man's clothing was similar to the clothing Crump had been wearing that day. On the strength of the statements of these two witnesses, Crump was indicted without a preliminary hearing. No gun was ever found, however, and Crump was never linked to any gun of the type used to murder Mary Pinchot Meyer.

The FBI crime report, withheld from the defense during the trial and published by Peter Janney in his book Mary's Mosaic, documented that there was no forensic evidence linking Crump to the victim or murder scene. Despite the fact that Meyer bled profusely from her head wound, no trace of her blood was found on Crump's person or clothing.

A very short time after Meyer's brother-in-law Ben Bradlee finished eating lunch, hours before police identified the body, CIA official Wistar Janney placed a phone call to Bradlee. According to Bradlee's account in his memoir A Good Life, moments earlier Janney had heard a radio news report about the murder of a woman at the C&O Canal. The victim was not identified by name. Author Peter Janney, son of Wistar, has established that as of approximately 2:00 pm, when District of Columbia police had Ray Crump in custody at the station, they did not know the identity of the murder victim. This was because Meyer had not carried identification or a purse while walking on the canal towpath. She owned a pocketbook that her brother-in-law Bradlee, several hours after he identified her body at the morgue, found in her art studio.

According to Bradlee's memoir, he did not listen to the radio before Wistar Janney phoned him about the radio news report of the anonymous murder victim. Bradlee was unaware a murder had taken place. The description of the woman in the radio news report made Janney think she was Bradlee's sister-in-law, according to what he told Bradlee on the phone. Bradlee immediately left his workplace at the downtown Washington office of Newsweek and went to his home in the Georgetown neighborhood. During his trip, he was uncertain as to who had been murdered; he arrived home and noticed the presence of several neighbors, including his close friend Harry "Doc" Dalinsky, a pharmacist. Dalinsky accompanied a shocked and distraught Bradlee to the Washington morgue, where Bradlee identified his sister-in-law's body.

According to Cord Meyer's account, immediately after Wistar Janney phoned Bradlee about the radio news report, Janney then phoned him, notifying him that a murder had occurred on the C&O Canal towpath and that his ex-wife was indeed the victim. Both in Bradlee's 1995 memoir and in a 2007 interview he did with Peter Janney, he did not voice suspicion about how Peter's father Wistar had known the identity of the murder victim who had not carried any documentation of her name or home address. Peter Janney says that in 2007, Bradlee "had a hard time recollecting certain events." Police identified the body after 3:45 pm. Wistar Janney had phoned Bradlee "just after lunch", according to Bradlee in his memoir.

When Crump came to trial in 1965, Judge Howard Corcoran ruled that Meyer's private life could not be disclosed in the courtroom. Her background was also kept from Dovey Johnson Roundtree, Crump's lawyer, who later recalled she could find out almost nothing about the murder victim: "It was as if she existed only on the towpath on the day she was murdered." At trial, Roundtree demonstrated the porousness of the police dragnet and showed that Crump was 50 pounds lighter and 5 inches shorter than the 5 foot 8 inch, 185 pound male that Henry Wiggins had described to police. Although Lt. William L. Mitchell estimated the height of the man he claimed to have seen trailing Meyer at five feet 8 inches, Mitchell was not able to identify Crump as that man when Mitchell testified at trial.

Crump was acquitted of all charges on July 29, 1965, and the murder remains unsolved. Author Nina Burleigh has argued that Crump's post-trial criminal history indicates his capacity to murder Meyer. Roundtree, however, attributed Crump's post-trial violence to the trauma he suffered during his eight-month imprisonment while he awaited trial for Meyer's murder. Other post-trial revelations have been cited in support of Crump's innocence, notably the likely presence of another black man at the crime scene and the fact that police dispatched a search for Crump's jacket 15 minutes before his arrest. Roundtree, in her autobiography Mighty Justice, stated that Crump had an alibi witness in the person of the married woman with whom he was having a sexual encounter near the crime scene, that the woman's account squared with Crump's account that he gave Roundtree, but that she refused to testify out of fear of her husband and disappeared before Crump's trial.

Bradlee said in A Good Life that despite Crump's acquittal on all charges, immediately thereafter District of Columbia police physically escorted him to the border of the District and Virginia. Police told him never to set foot in the District again—though he was the father of six underage children who lived there.

Cord Meyer left the CIA in 1977. In his 1982 autobiography Facing Reality: From World Federalism to the CIA, he wrote,

I was satisfied by the conclusions of the police investigation that Mary had been the victim of a sexually motivated assault by a single individual and that she had been killed in her struggle to escape.

He stated that he rejected "journalistic speculation" that said he believed his former wife's death had some other explanation.

== Posthumous allegations ==
=== James Truitt and the National Enquirer ===
The March 2, 1976, issue of the National Enquirer quoted James Truitt as stating Meyer had a two-year affair with John F. Kennedy and that they smoked marijuana in a White House bedroom. According to Truitt, their first rendezvous occurred after Meyer was chauffeured to the White House in a limousine driven by a Secret Service agent where she was met by Kennedy and taken to a bedroom. He stated that Meyer and Kennedy regularly met in that manner, sometimes two or three times each week, until his assassination. Truitt said the two would "usually have drinks or dinner alone or sometimes with one of the aides", and claimed that Meyer offered marijuana cigarettes to Kennedy after one such meeting on April 16, 1962. He said after they smoked three joints, she commented, "This isn't like cocaine. I'll get you some of that." According to the Enquirer, Meyer also kept a diary of the affair. The publication quoted Tony Bradlee — Meyer's sister — as confirming the existence of the affair and the diary, stating that Bradlee found the diary in Meyer's studio after her death, then turned it over to James Jesus Angleton, who subsequently burned it at CIA headquarters.

In an interview with a correspondent from the Washington Post, Truitt confirmed the Enquirer's account, stated that Meyer had told him of the affair, and that he had kept notes about what he had been told. According to Truitt, Meyer and Kennedy met approximately 30 times—frequently when Jackie Kennedy was out of town—from January 1962 until the time of the President's death in November 1963. Truitt stated that the two would occasionally have drinks or dinner with one of Kennedy's aides, whom he identified as David Powers and Timothy J. Reardon Jr. Contradicting his earlier account with the Enquirer, Truitt said Kennedy gave the marijuana to Meyer. Truitt acknowledged that he received payment from the Enquirer, but did not disclose the amount of payment.

Truitt's allegations were denied by Kennedy aides Kenneth O'Donnell and Timothy Reardon, Jr., and Powers was unavailable for comment. Meyer's sister Tony stated that the Enquirer had quoted her out of context to create the impression that she agreed with Truitt's allegations. The Washington Post, Associated Press and United Press International printed a follow-up story that cited assertions by Truitt's physician and his former wife that his judgment was impaired by mental illness. However, Truitt's allegations regarding Meyer's affair with the late President Kennedy and the existence of a diary in which she recorded the affair were confirmed in 1995 by her brother-in-law Ben Bradlee in his memoir A Good Life.

=== Diary ===
Ben Bradlee states in his 1995 memoir A Good Life that for several hours after he and his wife Tony learned her sister had been murdered, they were unaware she had kept a diary. On the night of the murder in their time zone, they received an international phone call from Meyer's friend Anne Truitt in Japan. She was looking for James Jesus Angleton at the Bradlee house. Truitt advised all of them, including Angleton, of the existence of the Meyer diary and the urgent need to retrieve it, given what Truitt said were its details of Meyer's affair with President Kennedy during the last two years of his life. A decision was then quickly made by Bradlee, his wife Tony, James Angleton and his wife Cicely, and another friend present at the scene, that if they found the diary, they were going to keep its existence from authorities.

According to Bradlee's 1995 account – one of at least four conflicting versions of the events surrounding the diary – the search at Meyer's art studio behind the Bradlee house began the day after the murder. Bradlee says he and his wife arrived at the studio with tools to obtain entry, since they had no key, and upon arriving they found Angleton in the process of picking the lock with special tools he had for that purpose. "The fact that the CIA's most controversial counterintelligence specialist had been caught in the act of breaking and entering, and looking for her diary," Bradlee said, was not something he considered appropriate for public disclosure. Regarding their discovery of the diary two days after the murder, he added that he and his wife, upon reading it and seeing that it revealed Meyer's affair with the late President Kennedy, "concluded this was in no sense a public document, despite the braying of the knee jerks about some public right to know."

=== Bradlee testimony at murder trial ===
Bradlee's 1995 memoir account conflicted with the testimony he gave at the July 1965 trial of Ray Crump, the black laborer accused of Meyer's murder, where he was asked by prosecuting attorney whether he had made any effort to gain entrance to his sister-in-law's art studio on the evening of the murder. Bradlee answered in the affirmative, but gave no indication of any difficulty in entering the padlocked premises, nor of the presence of anyone else accompanying him in this endeavor. Asked by prosecutor Alfred Hantman, "Now besides the usual articles of Mrs. Meyer's avocation, did you find there any other articles of her personal property?" Bradlee replied, "There was a pocketbook there," adding that it contained keys, a wallet, cosmetics, and pencils. He made no mention of the diary.

Upon learning years later of the existence, contents and alleged burning of the diary, prosecutor Alfred Hantman and defense attorney Dovey Johnson Roundtree, as well as D.C. Police Detective Bernie Crooke, stated that knowledge of that information at the time of the trial would have materially affected the proceedings. "I'd have been very upset at the time if I'd known that the deceased's diary had been destroyed," Crooke told author Ron Rosenbaum in 1976. In a 1991 interview with the late author Leo Damore, Hantman said that he had been "totally unaware of who Mary Meyer was or what her connections were," and that having that knowledge "could have changed everything." In her 2009 autobiography, Justice Older than the Law (reissued in 2019 as Mighty Justice), defense counsel Dovey Roundtree expressed shock at learning of the diary's significance from Bradlee's book. "How differently my line of cross-examination would have run had I been aware, on July 20, 1965, of the story Mr. Bradlee told thirty years later in his autobiography ... James Angleton's awareness of the diary's existence and his interest in finding it, reading it, and destroying it – all of that unsettled me deeply when I read Mr. Bradlee's 1995 account, as did his insistence that the diary was a private document ... Had I been aware of it, I would have felt compelled to pursue it."

Meyer biographers Peter Janney and Nina Burleigh have both criticized Bradlee's omission of key information under oath. "Bradlee had excoriated Cord Meyer [Meyer's ex-husband] for his 'derisive scorn' for the people's right to know in the 1960s, but the rules changed when the subject of a story was his sister-in-law," Burleigh says. "The First Amendment champion of the Watergate investigation admitted in his memoir that he gave Mary Meyer's diary to the CIA because it was 'a family document.'"

=== Timothy Leary ===
In his 1983 autobiography Flashbacks, former Harvard University psychology lecturer Timothy Leary claimed to have met Meyer several times. According to Leary, Meyer first came to see him at Harvard to learn how to give LSD sessions. They used psilocybin together, and she warned him that there were "powerful men" in Washington who wanted to "use drugs for warfare, for espionage, for brainwashing" while she and a group of women wanted to use drugs "for peace, not war" by holding LSD sessions with powerful Washington figures to enlighten them. Meyer gave Leary no clue that the president of the United States was one of the powerful men.

Leary writes that Meyer became afraid after one of the women she recruited for her plan to "turn on" powerful men in Washington "snitched" and she warned Leary that they were both in danger. Soon after Kennedy's assassination he received a phone call from a sobbing Meyer in which she said, "They couldn't control him any more. He was changing too fast ... They've covered everything up."

After the 1976 publication of the National Enquirer article on James Truitt's claims, Leary realized Meyer had been describing her affair and drug use with President Kennedy. He makes this claim in his 1983 memoir.

Biographers of both Leary and Meyer have treated Leary's claims with dismissal or caution. Leary biographer Robert Greenfield believes that Leary did have contact with Meyer but found no evidence that Meyer had taken LSD with Kennedy and writes that "a good deal of what Tim reported as fact in Flashbacks is pure fantasy." Meyer biographer Nina Burleigh also believes that Leary and Meyer met, but writes that "No one has ever confirmed that Kennedy tried LSD with Mary." She notes, however, that "the timing of her visits to Timothy Leary do coincide with her known private meetings with the president."

== See also ==
- List of unsolved murders (1900–1979)

== Bibliography ==
- Bradlee, Ben (1996). A Good Life: Newspapering and Other Adventures. New York: Simon & Schuster.
- Burleigh, Nina (2009-10-21). A Very Private Woman: The Life and Unsolved Murder of Presidential Mistress Mary Meyer. Random House Publishing Group. ISBN 978-0-307-57417-6.
- Janney, Peter (2013). Mary's Mosaic: The CIA Conspiracy to Murder John F. Kennedy, Mary Pinchot Meyer, and Their Vision for World Peace. New York: Skyhorse Publishing.
- Dovey Johnson Roundtree and Katie McCabe (2019). Mighty Justice: My Life in Civil Rights. New York: Algonquin Books.
