= Antoinette Pinchot Bradlee =

American socialite (1924–2011)

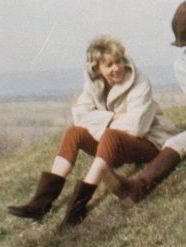
- Born: Antoinette Eno Pinchot; January 15, 1924; New York City, U.S.
- Died: November 9, 2011 (aged 87); Washington, D.C., U.S.
- Resting place: Milford Cemetery, Pike County, Pennsylvania
- Other name: Antoinette Pittman
- Education: Vassar College; Corcoran School of the Arts and Design
- Occupations: Journalist; ceramist; painter
- Spouse: Steuart L. Pittman (m. 1947; div. 1955) Ben Bradlee (m. 1957; div. 1975)
- Children: 6
- Parents: Amos Pinchot (father); Ruth Pickering Pinchot (mother)
- Relatives: Gifford Pinchot (uncle); Rosamond Pinchot (half-sister); Mary Pinchot Meyer (sister)

Antoinette Eno "Tony" Pinchot Pittman Bradlee (January 15, 1924 – November 9, 2011) was an American socialite, ceramist, and painter. She was the second wife of The Washington Post editor Ben Bradlee and the sister of Mary Pinchot Meyer, a mistress of President John F. Kennedy.

Before marriage, Pinchot was a journalist on Vogue magazine. In the 1950s and 1960s, the Bradlees were frequent guests of the Kennedy family and was a close friend of First Lady Jackie Kennedy. Later on, she became a ceramist and painter. Her marriage with Bradlee fell apart due to his work commitments and she spent the rest of her life focused on fine arts.

== Early life and career ==
Born in New York City to a politically active family, the Pinchots, she was the youngest child of Amos Pinchot and Ruth Pickering Pinchot. Her older sister was Mary Pinchot Meyer and she had two older half-siblings from her father's first marriage: Gifford and Rosamond Pinchot. She was known to her family and friends as "Tony".

Along with her sister Mary, she was raised at the family's Grey Towers home in Milford, Pennsylvania. Pinchot attended the Brearley School and Vassar College. After college, she worked on Vogue magazine until her marriage.

== Marriages ==
=== First marriage ===
Pinchot's first marriage was to Steurt Pittman, who later served as President John F. Kennedy's assistant Secretary of Defense. They married in 1947 and had four children together: Andrew, Nancy, Rosamond, and Tamara.

During a trip to Europe with her sister Mary, Pinchot met Ben Bradlee, at the time chief European correspondent for Newsweek. The two immediately fell in love; they divorced their respective spouses and married in 1956.

=== Second marriage ===
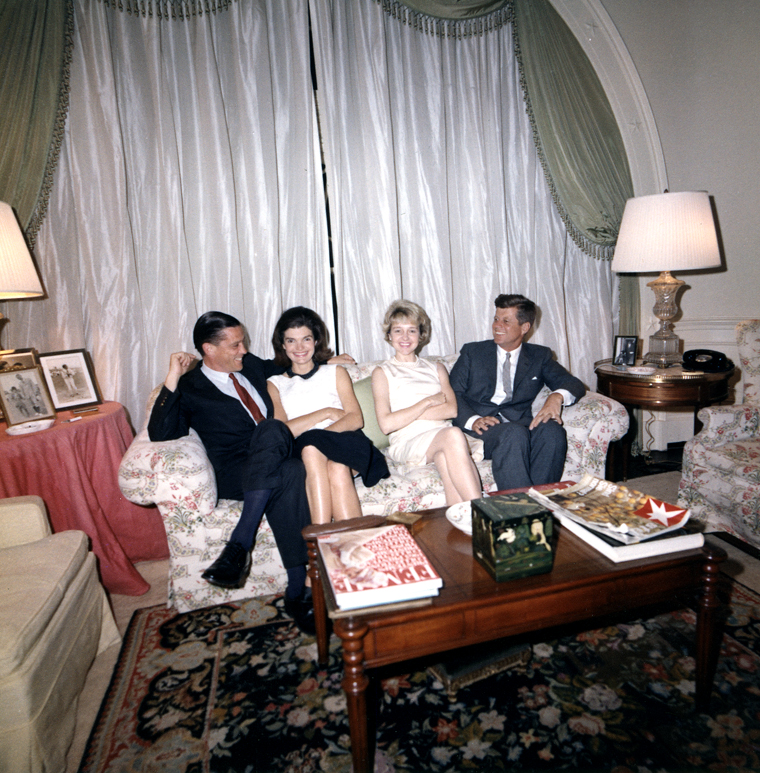
John and Jackie Kennedy with Ben and Tony Bradlee, at the White House residence

Ben and Tony Bradlee had two children together: Dominic (known as "Dino") and Marina.

The newly married Bradlees settled in Georgetown in Washington, D.C., where their neighbor was then-Senator John F. Kennedy of Massachusetts and his wife Jackie Kennedy. The Bradlees and Kennedys became close friends, with Tony and Jackie in particular becoming close friends. They were frequent visitors of the Kennedys at their retreats, at the White House, and at Camp David.

Bradlee later told Kennedy biographer Sally Bedell Smith that President Kennedy once made a pass at her during his 46th birthday party on the presidential yacht; however, she rebuffed him. Her sister Mary, however, began a long-term affair with the president.

Through her marriage to Bradlee and her connection with the Kennedys, Tony became one of the top Washington hostesses of the 1960s. However, she grew tired of her duties and withdrew from public life after Kennedy's assassination. Finding her husband's work as a journalist "uninspiring", she attended Corcoran School of the Arts and Design and became a ceramicist and painter. In 1972, she held a solo exhibition at the Jefferson Place Gallery in Washington and earned rave reviews.

After Ben Bradlee joined The Washington Post and became its executive editor, he devoted himself to the paper almost fully. As a result, their marriage suffered and they ended up divorcing in 1975. However, the pair would remain lifelong friends.

== Later life ==
After her divorce, Pinchot Bradlee focused her energy on her interests in fine arts as well as the spiritual philosophy movement started by Russian-born mystic George Ivanovitch Gurdjieff.

Bradlee never remarried and died in Washington, D.C., after years of suffering from dementia. She was buried in her family plot in Pike County, Pennsylvania.

== Cultural depictions ==
Pinchot was played by actress Sarah Paulson in the 2017 Steven Spielberg film The Post.
