= Amos Pinchot =

American lawyer (1873–1944)

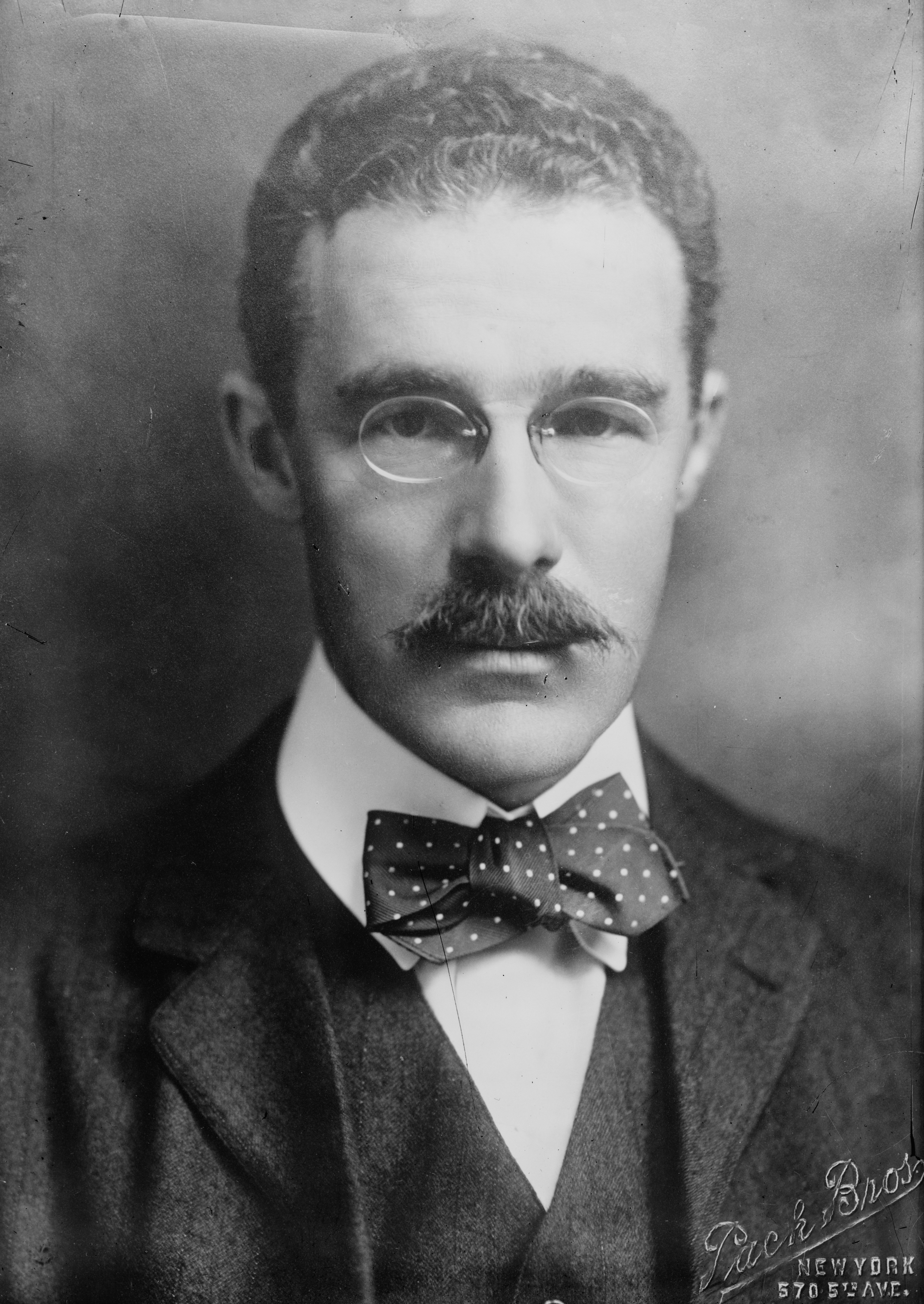
- Pinchot, c. 1910–1915
- Born: December 6, 1873; Paris, France
- Died: February 18, 1944 (aged 70); The Bronx, New York City
- Resting place: Milford Cemetery
- Education: Yale University; Columbia University; New York Law School
- Occupations: Lawyer, reformist
- Spouses: Gertrude Minturn (m. 1900; div. 1918) Ruth Pickering (m. 1919–1944)
- Children: 4, including Rosamond Pinchot, Mary Pinchot Meyer, Antoinette Pinchot Bradlee
- Relatives: Gifford Pinchot (brother)

Amos Richards Eno Pinchot (December 6, 1873 – February 18, 1944) was an American lawyer and reformist. He never held public office but managed to exert considerable influence in reformist circles and did much to keep progressive and Georgist ideas alive in the 1920s.

== Early life and education ==
Pinchot was born in Paris, to American parents, James Wallace Pinchot (1831–1908), a successful New York City wallpaper merchant and supporter of the conservation movement and Mary Jane Pinchot (née Eno, 1838–1914), daughter of one of New York City's wealthiest real estate developers, Amos Eno. His siblings were the conservation leader Gifford Pinchot, and Antoinette E. Pinchot who later married Alan Johnstone. The Pinchots were Episcopalians.

Pinchot was educated at St. Paul's, and at Yale where he was a member of the secret society Skull and Bones, He graduated with a Bachelor of Arts degree in 1897. In 1898, Pinchot enrolled at Columbia University to study law. Later that same year, he left school to fight in the Spanish–American War. Pinchot enlisted in the 1st New York Volunteer Cavalry and served in Puerto Rico. After the war ended, he enrolled in New York Law School in 1899 and was admitted to the bar association in New York in 1900.

== Career ==
Shortly after being admitted to the bar, Pinchot was appointed deputy assistant district attorney for New York County. He left the position in 1901.

In 1905, Pinchot served a year's political apprenticeship as a lobbyist for President Theodore Roosevelt and returned to Washington again in 1909 to live and work with his brother Gifford during the Pinchot–Ballinger controversy, which pitted his brother (recently fired as the US Forest Service chief) against President William Howard Taft's Secretary of the Interior. Taft had fired Gifford for insubordination, which inflamed the insurgent wing of the Republican Party allied to Roosevelt.

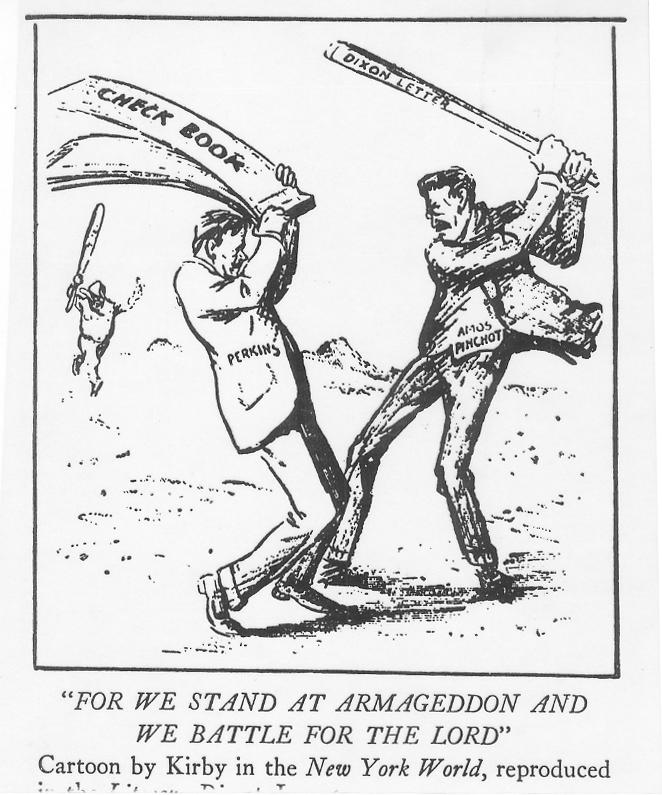
Pinchot (wielding a letter of support from Roosevelt campaign manager Senator Joseph M. Dixon) in battle with Perkins (with a check book symbolizing control of money) for control of the U.S. Progressive party. Editorial cartoon by Rollin Kirby, 1912.

Though a member of Roosevelt's inner circle during the Bull Moose campaign of 1912, Pinchot exasperated the former president with his moralistic criticism of the role of big business in the party, including his criticism of the party chairman, George Walbridge Perkins, who was a leading industrialist and sat on the board of U.S. Steel. Pinchot ultimately joined the Democratic Party, defended the rights of workers, and became acquainted with leftist intellectuals.

In 1924, he supported Robert M. La Follette's presidential bid and wrote a history of the Progressive Party which is an important primary historical document, an eye-witness account and analysis by a major insider activist in Progressive politics for twenty years. His opposition to preparedness before World War I, insistence that wartime profits be heavily taxed, strong anticommunism in his later years, and involvement in the America First Committee alienated many political allies and made his last days difficult. In 1937, he was a founding member of the National Committee to Uphold Constitutional Government.

== Personal life ==
On November 14, 1900, Pinchot married Gertrude Minturn at St. George's Episcopal Church in New York City. Minturn was the eldest daughter of shipping magnate Robert Bowne Minturn Jr. and his wife Sarah Susannah Minturn (née Shaw). They had two children, Rosamond and Gifford Pinchot. The couple divorced in 1918.

In August 1919, Pinchot married magazine writer Ruth Pickering. With Pickering, Pinchot would have two more children: Mary Eno (later Mary Pinchot Meyer) and Antoinette "Tony" Pinchot (later Bradlee).

== Later years and death ==
On January 24, 1938, Pinchot's eldest daughter Rosamond committed suicide at the age of 33. Rosamond's death sent Pinchot into a deep depression and, in August 1942, he attempted suicide by slashing his wrists. He lost a considerable amount of blood during the attempt and would never regain his health. He was confined to hospitals and sanatoriums for the remainder of his life.

Pinchot died of bronchial pneumonia on February 18, 1944, in a Bronx sanatorium. His funeral was held at the Brick Presbyterian Church in New York City. Amos Pinchot is buried in the Pinchot family plot in Milford Cemetery in Milford, Pennsylvania. Helene Maxwell Hooker assembled some of Pinchot's unfinished drafts for the book History of the Progressive Party, 1912-1916, and it was released in 1958.

== Works ==
- What's the Matter with America: The Meaning of the Progressive Movement and the Rise of the New Party. n.c.: Amos Pinchot, 1912.
- History of the Progressive Party, 1912–1916. Introduction by Helene Maxwell Hooker. New York: New York University Press, 1958.
