= Ruth Pickering Pinchot =

American journalist

- Born: Ruth Pickering; June 20, 1893; Elmira, New York
- Died: December 24, 1984 (aged 91); New York City
- Education: Vassar College
- Occupation: writer
- Spouse: Amos Pinchot (m. 1919)
- Children: Mary Pinchot Meyer, Antoinette Pinchot Bradlee

Ruth Pickering Pinchot (born Ruth Pickering; June 20, 1893 – December 24, 1984) was an American writer, critic, and activist.

== Early life ==
Ruth Pickering was born in 1893 in Elmira, New York. She was born to a family of Quakers who ran a small company, Peerless Dyes. Ruth graduated from Vassar College in 1914. Upon graduation, she moved to Greenwich Village, New York, where she lived in a communal house with Crystal Eastman, and several other writers, artists, and thinkers.

== Career and activism ==
Ruth contributed to primarily left leaning publications such as The Masses, The Nation and The New Republic. As a writer for The Nation, Ruth authored an essay reflecting on the development of her own views of feminism as part of a series called "These Modern Women," which published over 1926 and 1927. She was an advocate of birth control and a suffragette. Early in her career, Ruth frequently wrote about the labor movement. Along with her husband Amos she became involved with the political group the Committee of 48. By the late 1920s, Ruth became an art and dance critic, leaving behind many of the topics covered earlier in her career.

Although Ruth was known as a left-leaning writer early in her career, her politics began to shift to the right in 1930s. Her objections to Franklin Delano Roosevelt's New Deal programs solidified her rightward shift. Pinchot and her husband began to embrace the isolationist group America First.

== Personal life ==
In August 1919, Ruth married Amos Pinchot. Amos had been a frequent visitor of the communal house which Ruth shared with other writers. With Amos Pinchot she had two daughters, Antoinette Pinchot Bradlee (1924–2011) and Mary Pinchot Meyer.

Amos, Ruth, and Gifford and Cornelia Pinchot donated the former Pinchot family home to Milford, Pennsylvania, on July 1, 1924. The donated home was turned into a local branch of the Pike County Library.
