= Ben Bradlee =

Executive editor of The Washington Post from 1968 to 1991

- Bradlee in 1999
- Born: Benjamin Crowninshield Bradlee; August 26, 1921; Boston, Massachusetts, U.S.
- Died: October 21, 2014 (aged 93); Washington, D.C., U.S.
- Resting place: Oak Hill Cemetery, Washington, D.C., U.S.
- Education: Harvard University (BA)
- Occupation: Newspaper editor
- Employer: The Washington Post
- Known for: publication of the Pentagon Papers and reporting the Watergate scandal
- Spouse: Jean Saltonstall (m. 1942; div. 1956) Antoinette Pinchot (m. 1957; div. 1977) Sally Quinn (m. 1978)
- Children: 4, including Ben Jr. and Quinn
- Parent: Frederick Bradlee; Josephine de Gersdorff
- Relatives: Crowninshield family
- Awards: Knight of the National Order of the Legion of Honor; Presidential Medal of Freedom
- Military career
- Branch: United States Navy
- Service years: 1942–1945
- Rank: Lieutenant
- Units: Second Fleet
- Conflicts: World War II; Borneo Campaign; Battle of Leyte Gulf; Solomon Islands campaign

Benjamin Crowninshield Bradlee (August 26, 1921 – October 21, 2014) was an American journalist who served as managing editor and later as executive editor of The Washington Post, from 1965 to 1991. He became a public figure when the Post joined The New York Times in publishing the Pentagon Papers and gave the go-ahead for the paper's extensive coverage of the Watergate scandal in the 1970s. He was also criticized for editorial lapses when the Post had to return a Pulitzer Prize in 1981 after it discovered that its award-winning story was false.

After his retirement, Bradlee continued to be associated with the Post, holding the position of Vice President at-large until his death. In retirement, Bradlee was an advocate for education and the study of history, including his role as a trustee on the boards of several major educational, historical, and archaeological research institutions.

== Early life and education ==
Ben Bradlee was born in Boston, Massachusetts, to Frederick Josiah Bradlee Jr., who was from the Boston Brahmin Bradlee family and who was an investment banker, and Josephine de Gersdorff, daughter of a Wall Street lawyer. His great uncle was Frank Crowninshield, founder and first editor of Vanity Fair.

Bradlee was the second of three children; his siblings were older brother Frederick, a writer and Broadway stage actor, and younger sister Constance. The children grew up in a wealthy family with domestic staff. They learned French from governesses, took piano and riding lessons, and went to the symphony and the opera; but the stock market crash of 1929 cost Bradlee's father his job, and he took on whatever work he could find to support his family, including selling deodorants and molybdenum mining stock "for companies founded and financed by some of his rich pals", according to his son Ben Bradlee. His father's career improved later: he served as a financial consultant to the Boston Museum of Fine Arts and was appointed to the Massachusetts State Parole Board in 1945, of which he was president for ten years until his retirement in 1957.

With the help of wealthy relatives, Bradlee was able to continue his education at Dexter School, and to finish high school at St. Mark's School, where he played varsity baseball. At St. Mark's he contracted polio, but sufficiently recovered to walk without limping. He attended Harvard College, where his father had been a star football player, and graduated in 1942 with a combined Greek–English major.

== World War II service ==
Like many of his classmates, Bradlee anticipated the United States would eventually enter World War II and enrolled in the Naval ROTC at Harvard. As a result, he received his naval commission on the same day he graduated. He was assigned to the Office of Naval Intelligence, and served as a communications officer in the Pacific. He was assigned to the destroyer USS Philip based off the shore of Guam and arriving at Guadalcanal with the Second Transport Group, part of Task Group 62.4, commanded by Rear Admiral Norman Scott. Bradlee's main battles were Vella Lavella, Saipan, Tinian, and Bougainville. He also fought in the biggest naval battle ever fought, the Battle of Leyte Gulf in the Philippines Campaign, in the Borneo Campaign, and made every landing in the Solomon Islands campaign.

== Early career in journalism ==
At loose ends after the war, Bradlee was recruited by a high school classmate in 1946 to work at the New Hampshire Sunday News, a new Sunday paper in Manchester, New Hampshire. The paper struggled to develop advertising revenue and circulation for two years, but was finally sold to the Manchester Union-Leader, the competing daily newspaper. Bradlee appealed to family friends for job leads, and gained interviews at both The Baltimore Sun and The Washington Post. According to Bradlee, when the train arrived in Baltimore it was raining, so he stayed on the train to Washington and was hired by The Washington Post as a reporter. He got to know associate publisher Phil Graham, who was the son-in-law of the publisher, Eugene Meyer. On November 1, 1950, Bradlee was alighting from a streetcar in front of the White House just as two Puerto Rican nationalists attempted to shoot their way into Blair House in an attempt to kill President Harry S. Truman. In 1951, Bradlee became assistant press attaché in the American embassy in Paris. In 1954, Bradlee took on a new job as European correspondent for Newsweek. He remained overseas for another four years until he was transferred to Newsweek's Washington D.C. bureau.

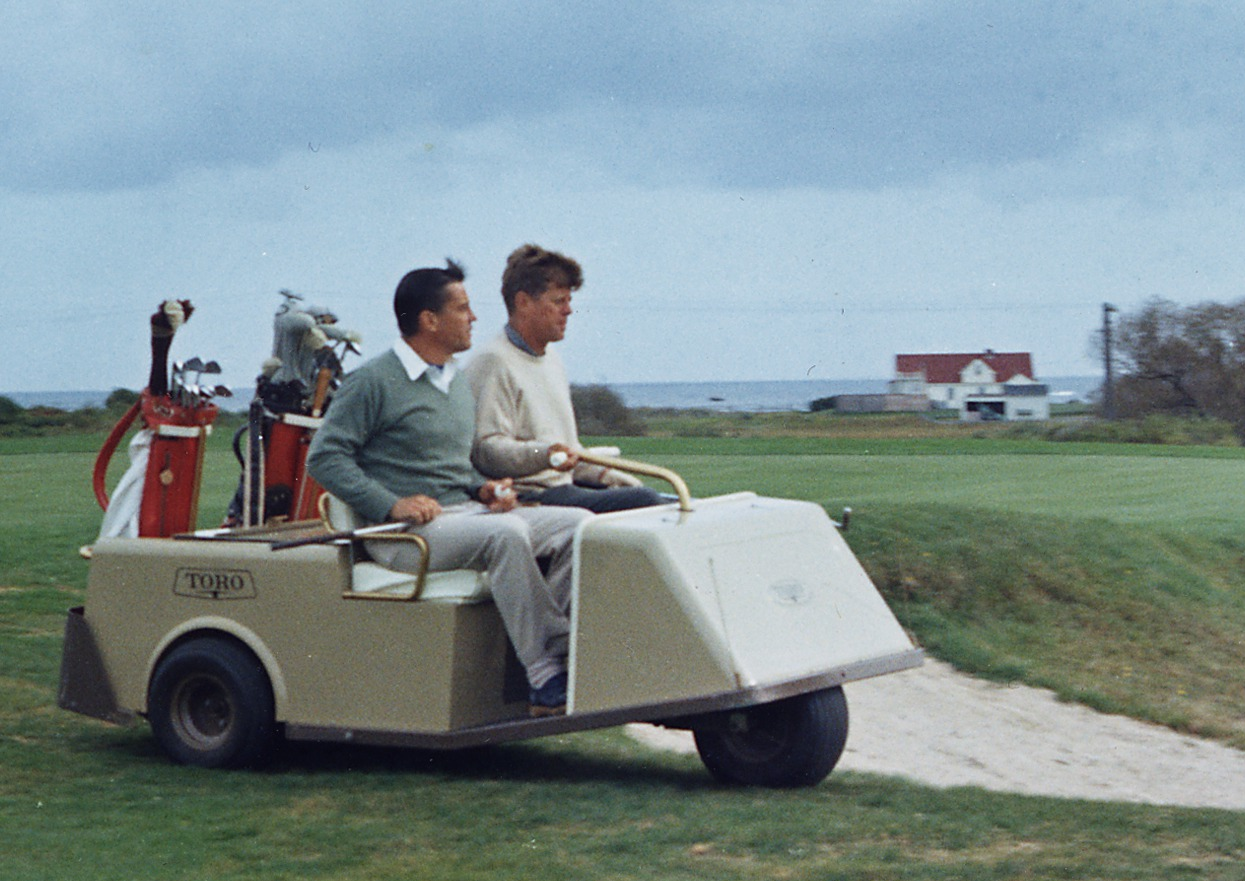
Bradlee golfing with John F. Kennedy in 1963

As a reporter in the 1950s, Bradlee became close friends with then-senator John F. Kennedy, who had graduated from Harvard two years before Bradlee, and lived nearby. In 1960, Bradlee toured with both Kennedy and Richard Nixon in their presidential campaigns. He later wrote a book, Conversations With Kennedy (W.W. Norton, 1975), recounting their relationship during those years. Bradlee was, at this point, Washington Bureau chief for Newsweek, a position from which he helped negotiate the sale of the magazine to The Washington Post holding company.

== Career at The Washington Post ==
Bradlee remained with Newsweek until he was promoted to managing editor at the Post in 1965. He became executive editor in 1968.

Under Bradlee's leadership, The Washington Post took on major challenges during the Nixon administration. In 1971 he hid a team of lawyers, editors and writers led by him and Ben Bagdikian in Bradlee's own Georgetown home, and supervised the team's resulting publication of the Pentagon Papers. The New York Times and the Post successfully challenged the government over the right to publish the Papers.

One year later, Bradlee backed reporters Bob Woodward and Carl Bernstein as they probed the break-in at the Democratic National Committee Headquarters in the Watergate Hotel. According to Bradlee:

You had a lot of Cuban or Spanish-speaking guys in masks and rubber gloves, with walkie-talkies, arrested in the Democratic National Committee Headquarters at 2 in the morning. What the hell were they in there for? What were they doing? The follow-up story was based primarily on their arraignment in court, and it was based on information given our police reporter, Al Lewis, by the cops, showing them an address book that one of the burglars had in his pocket, and in the address book was the name 'Hunt,' H-u-n-t, and the phone number was the White House phone number, which Al Lewis and every reporter worth his salt knew. And when, the next day, Woodward—this is probably Sunday or maybe Monday, because the burglary was Saturday morning early—called the number and asked to speak to Mr. Hunt, and the operator said, 'Well, he's not here now; he's over at' such-and-such a place, gave him another number, and Woodward called him up, and Hunt answered the phone, and Woodward said, 'We want to know why your name was in the address book of the Watergate burglars.' And there is this long, deathly hush, and Hunt said, 'Oh my God!' and hung up. So you had the White House. You have Hunt saying 'Oh my God!' At a later arraignment, one of the guys whispered to a judge. The judge said, 'What do you do?' and Woodward overheard the words 'CIA.' So if your interest isn't whetted by this time, you're not a journalist.

Ensuing investigations of suspected cover-ups led inexorably to congressional committees, conflicting testimonies, and ultimately to the resignation of Richard Nixon in 1974. For decades, Bradlee was one of only four publicly known people who knew the true identity of press informant Deep Throat, the other three being Woodward, Bernstein, and Deep Throat himself, who later revealed himself to be Nixon's FBI associate director Mark Felt.

In 1981, Post reporter Janet Cooke won a Pulitzer Prize for "Jimmy's World", a profile of an eight-year-old heroin addict. Cooke's article turned out to be fiction — there was no such addict. As executive editor, Bradlee was roundly criticized in many circles for failing to ensure the article's accuracy. After questions about the story's veracity arose, Bradlee (along with publisher Donald Graham) ordered a "full disclosure" investigation to ascertain the truth. Bradlee personally apologized to Mayor Marion Barry and the chief of police of Washington, D.C., for the Post's fictitious article. Cooke, meanwhile, was forced to resign from the Post and relinquish the Pulitzer.

== Activities and awards after retirement ==
Bradlee retired as the executive editor of The Washington Post in September 1991 but continued to serve as vice president at large until his death. He was succeeded as executive editor at the Post by Leonard Downie Jr., whom Bradlee had appointed as managing editor seven years earlier.

In 1991, he was persuaded by then–governor of Maryland William Donald Schaefer to accept the chairmanship of the Historic St. Mary's City Commission and continued in that position through 2003. He also served for many years as a member of the board of trustees at St. Mary's College of Maryland, and endowed the Benjamin C. Bradlee Annual Lecture in Journalism there. He continued to serve as vice chairman of the school's board of trustees.

In 1991, Bradlee delivered the Theodore H. White lecture at the John F. Kennedy School of Government at Harvard University. His message: Lying in Washington, whether in the White House or the Congress, is wrong, immoral, tearing at the fiber of our national instincts and institutions — and must stop. He said, "Lying has reached such epidemic proportions in our culture and among our institutions in recent years, that we've all become immunized to it." He suggested that the deceit was degrading the respect for the truth.

Bradlee had an acting role in Born Yesterday, the 1993 remake of the 1950 romantic comedy.

In 1988, Bradlee received the Golden Plate Award of the American Academy of Achievement.

His autobiography, A Good Life: Newspapering and Other Adventures, was published in 1995.

In recognition of his work as editor of The Washington Post, Bradlee won the Walter Cronkite Award for Excellence in Journalism in 1998.

In the fall of 2005, Jim Lehrer interviewed Bradlee for six hours on topics from the responsibilities of the press to Watergate to the Valerie Plame affair. The interviews were edited for an hour-long documentary, Free Speech: Jim Lehrer and Ben Bradlee, which premiered on PBS on June 19, 2006.

On May 3, 2006, Bradlee received a Doctor of Humane Letters from Georgetown University in Washington, D.C. Prior to receiving the honorary degree, he taught occasional journalism courses at Georgetown. Bradlee received the French Legion of Honor, the highest award given by the French government, at a ceremony in 2007 in Paris.

Bradlee was named as a recipient of the Presidential Medal of Freedom by President Barack Obama on August 8, 2013, and was presented the medal at a White House ceremony on November 20, 2013.

== Marriages and children ==
Bradlee was married three times. His first marriage was to Jean Saltonstall. Like Bradlee, Saltonstall also came from a wealthy and prominent Boston family. They married on August 8, 1942, the same day Bradlee graduated from Harvard and entered the Navy. They had one son, Ben Bradlee Jr., who later became first a reporter, then a deputy managing editor at The Boston Globe.

Bradlee and his first wife divorced while he was an overseas correspondent for Newsweek. In 1957, he married Antoinette 'Tony' Pinchot Pittman (sister of Mary Pinchot Meyer). Together, they had a son, Dominic, and a daughter, Marina. This marriage also ended in divorce.

Bradlee's final marriage was to The Washington Post reporter Sally Quinn in 1978. Quinn and Bradlee had one child, Quinn Bradlee (born 1982) when Quinn was 40 and Bradlee was 60.

== Death ==
External videos
- Funeral service for Ben Bradlee, National Cathedral, October 29, 2014, C-SPAN

Bradlee suffered from Alzheimer's disease in his final years. In late September 2014, he entered hospice care due to declining health. He died October 21, 2014, at his home in Washington, D.C., at the age of 93. His funeral was held at the Washington National Cathedral. He was buried at the Oak Hill Cemetery in Washington, D.C.

== In popular culture ==
- Actor Jason Robards portrayed Bradlee in the 1976 film All the President's Men, winning a Best Supporting Actor Oscar for his performance.
- Henderson Forsythe played Bradlee in the 1989 romantic comedy Chances Are.
- G. D. Spradlin played the role of Bradlee in Dick, a 1999 spoof of Watergate.
- Éric Soubelet portrayed Bradlee in the 2016 historical drama Jackie.
- Tom Hanks portrayed Bradlee in director Steven Spielberg's 2017 historical drama The Post.
- Alfred Molina played Bradlee in the 2018 historical drama The Front Runner.

== Books ==
- Bradlee, Ben. Conversations With Kennedy (W W Norton & Co Inc, November 1, 1984) ISBN 978-0-393-30189-2
- Bradlee, Ben. A Good Life: Newspapering and Other Adventures (Simon & Schuster, October, 1995) ISBN 978-0-684-80894-9

Preceded by James Russell Wiggins	Executive Editor of The Washington Post; 1968-1991	Succeeded by Leonard Downie Jr
