= Constance Crowninshield Coolidge =

Boston Brahmin and socialite

Constance Coolidge
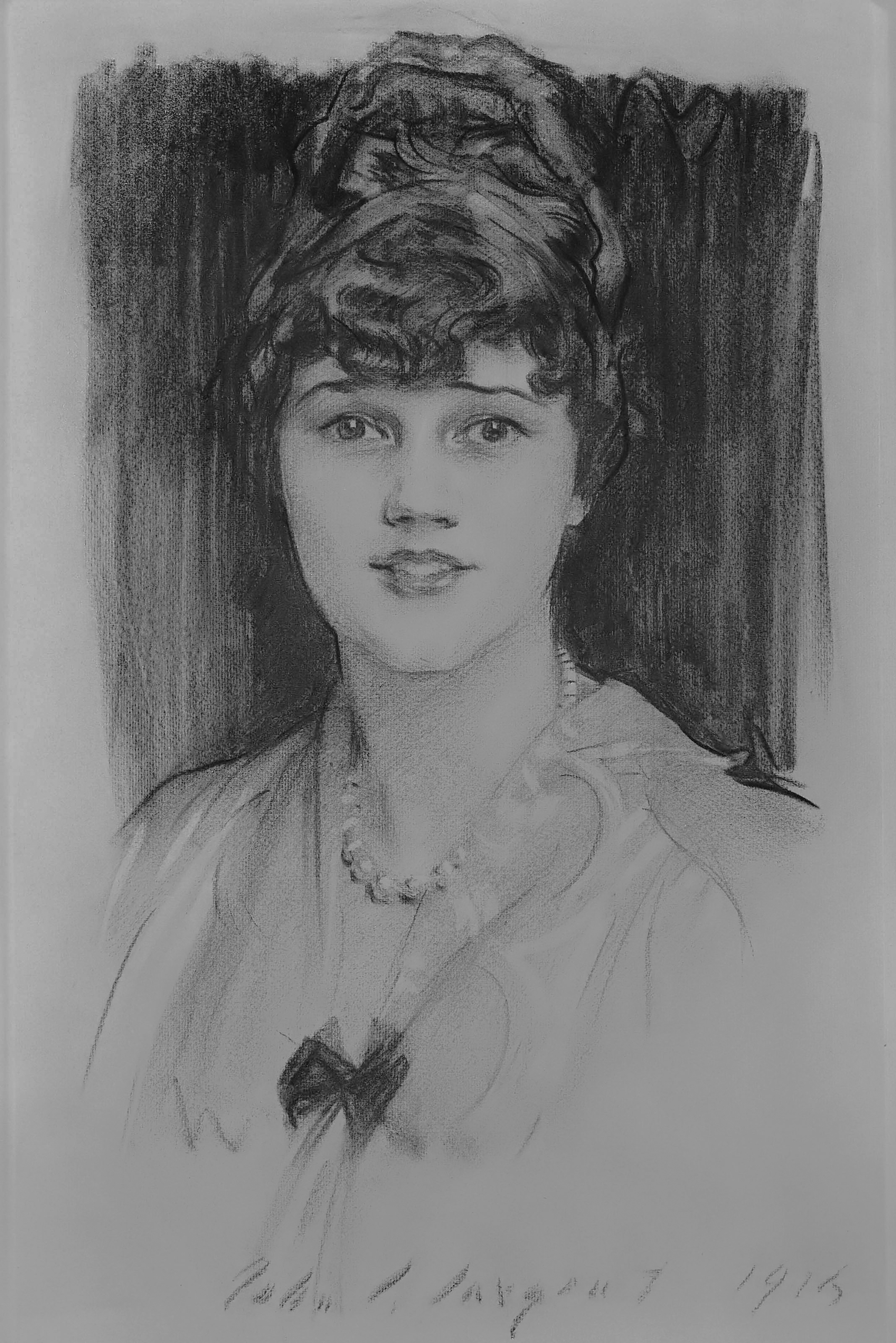
- Charcoal drawing of Constance, 1915
- Born: Constance Crowninshield Coolidge; January 4, 1892; Boston, Massachusetts, US
- Died: April 30, 1973 (aged 81); Neuilly-sur-Seine, France
- Resting place: Père Lachaise Cemetery
- Spouses: Ray Atherton (m. 1910; div. 1924) Count Pierre de Jumilhac (m. 1924; div. 1929) Eliot Rogers (m. 1930; div. 1932) André Magnus (m. 1940)
- Relatives: Caspar Crowninshield (grandfather)

Constance Crowninshield Coolidge (January 4, 1892 – April 30, 1973), was a Boston Brahmin (a member of Boston's upper society), socialite, heiress and a long-term American expatriate living in Paris. She had the pedigree of the most elite Boston Brahmin: she was a descendant of the Adams, Amory, Coolidge, Copley, Crowninshield, and Peabody families, all of them well known in Boston's high society. She was a distant relative of Calvin Coolidge.

A trust child and in adulthood a self-proclaimed socialist, Constance rejected her Brahmin background early in life, replacing it with a Parisian life from 1923 onwards. Her friendships included the literati such as Harry Crosby, Hart Crane, Robert Herrick, Somerset Maugham and H. G. Wells, who affectionately referred to her as Connie.

== Early life ==
Constance was born in Boston, Massachusetts on January 4, 1892. She was a daughter of landscape architect, David Hill Coolidge and Harriet Sears (née Crowninshield) Coolidge.

She was the granddaughter of Caspar Crowninshield, Commander of the 2nd Massachusetts Cavalry during the U.S. Civil War, and the niece of the music patron Elizabeth Sprague Coolidge and Frank Crowninshield, editor of Vanity Fair. Among her first cousins was Ben Bradlee. She was also a distant relative of former U.S. President Calvin Coolidge. Her great-aunt, Fanny Crowninshield, was the wife of John Quincy Adams II, and the mother of George Caspar Adams and Charles Francis Adams III, who were like uncles to her.

== Interests ==
Constance was known for her love of anything risky; she was addicted to horse racing, gambling and extramarital affairs. While married to the Count, she became prominent in the arts, as well as one of the most prominent racehorse owners in France. With her third husband, she attended the "Concours Hippique", the Paris Horse Show of 1932 and was described as an outstanding figure on the French turf.

Passionate about horse racing, she owned a very large stable of horses and she would go to the racetrack every day. Constance became successful enough to earn herself the nickname "The Lady with the Golden Horse". In 1933, her horse "Yarlas" came in fourth at Auteuil Track. In 1934 her horse "Jean-Victor", won the Prix du Président de la République at the Auteuil Hippodrome. Summers were spent at the Hotel Negresco in Nice.

Russell Page and the exiled William Lygon, 7th Earl Beauchamp were among her sexual conquests.

In 1934, she met the writer H. G. Wells, twenty-five years her senior, with whom she conducted a passionate affair in the last decade of his life. By the time she was forty years of age, she was juggling multiple relationships with H.G. Wells, Philippe Barrès, the editor of Paris Match and Paris-soir, and the recently widowed William Lygon, 7th Earl Beauchamp who asked her hand in marriage in 1936.

In 1936 she invited her close friend, Wallis Simpson to Paris, having sympathy of one of her oldest friends during the abdication of Edward VIII. Constance was a guest at Wallis Simpson’s wedding, a private ceremony held a year later, on 3 June 1937 at the Château de Candé.

Constance remained at the center of social events and was friends with Ernest Hemingway and Wallis Simpson. In 1938, her father was terminally ill; she returned to California and was with him at the time of his death. She returned to France spending Christmas in the company of the Windsor's and accompanied them to Monte Carlo.

== Personal life ==
While in Paris studying languages, eighteen-year-old Constance met fellow Bostonian Ray Atherton who was studying architecture at the Beaux-Arts de Paris. Atherton asked her father for permission to marry, but Coolidge insisted they wait a year. Nevertheless, Atherton persisted and while the Coolidges were touring Germany, he obtained a marriage license and when they returned to Paris, Constance and Ray were married.

The couple resided initially in Chicago, Illinois before moving to London returning a second time in 1917, when her husband entered the U.S. foreign service. During their marriage, she accompanied her husband to China on a diplomatic posting, where she, a determined gambler, behaved wildly enough to earn herself the nickname "The Queen of Peking". Living there during American Prohibition in the early 1920s proved tantalizing for her. Constance wore dresses that were flamboyant and she spared little thought of what others might say about her. She engaged in extramarital liaisons, which placed a great deal of a strain on their marriage. Among her affairs were those with British diplomat Eric Brenan and American expat, Felix Doubleday, the adoptive son of publisher Frank Nelson Doubleday. Love letters from both Brenan and Doubleday have been preserved at the Massachusetts Historical Society. It was also during this time that she became friends with Wallis Simpson and Katherine and Herman Rogers. She had multiple admirers and received regular relationship advice from her relative and financial guardian, Charles Francis Adams III, written on his "Secretary of the US Navy" stationery.

When Atherton was recalled to the State Department, she remained in China on the plea that her horses needed attention. Later, Atherton was assigned to head up the U.S. Embassy in Athens and Constance moved to Paris. In Paris, she became intimately involved for a time with fellow Boston Brahmin, hedonistic poet and publisher Harry Crosby, whose wife Caresse Crosby was the first recipient of a patent for the modern bra. In 1924, Constance obtained a divorce, reportedly in China, from Atherton who later married Maude Hunnewell, with whom he had two children before his death in 1960.

=== Second marriage ===
Following her divorce from Atherton, she became engaged to the former polo player, Antoine Clément Marie Pierre Chapelle de Jumilhac, also known as Count Pierre de Jumilhac, a member of one of the oldest noble families of Brittany. They married on October 11, 1924, and she became Comtesse de Jumilhac. The marriage to the Count did not last, and they divorced in Paris in May 1929. D. H. Lawrence, the English writer, wrote to Harry Crosby and mentioned Constance:

Good that Constance – la Comtesse – has her divorce – but tell her to spend a year in contemplation before she starts marrying again. Marriage is a treacherous stimulant.

Constance remarried twelve months later and Count de Jumilhac died two years later on October 18, 1932, following a long illness.

=== Third marriage ===
After her second divorce, Constance visited her parents who had relocated to Santa Barbara. Shortly after, she met Eliot Rogers and their marriage was announced by The New York Times on February 26, 1930, with the headline "Countess Wed on Coast". Eliot was the brother of author Cameron Rogers and a nephew of Chicago banker Charles Fernald and Reginald Fernald, the owner of the Santa Barbara Morning Press. She returned to France with Eliot, however, by November 1933, the papers referred to Constance by her maiden name, since her marriage to newspaper owner Eliot had ended in divorce.

=== Fourth marriage ===
In 1940 she married André William Magnus, a public relations manager in the French Film Industry and spent most of the rest of her life in Paris.

Constance died at the American Hospital in Paris on April 30, 1973, and her husband, André scattered her ashes in a vault situated on the top of a hill in the Père Lachaise Cemetery. Although she was a distant relative of Calvin Coolidge, a range of U.S. regional newspapers from Alabama to Meriden, Connecticut published her obituary erroneously describing her as one of his daughters.

== Collection of photography ==
The Southern Illinois University, Carbondale holds a series of photographs of her life as part of the Caresse Crosby Collection.

== Ancestry ==
Crowninshield-Bradlee family tree

Benjamin Williams Crowninshield (1772–1851)
Francis Boardman Crowninshield (1809–1877)	Jonathan Mason Warren (1811–1867)	Annie G. Crowninshield (1815–1905)	Edward A. Crowninshield (1817–1859)	George Casper Crowninshield (1810–1857)
Benjamin W. Crowninshield (1837–1892)	Alice Crowninshield (1839–1902)	Josiah Bradlee III (1837–1902)	Frederic Crowninshield (1845–1918)	Caspar Crowninshield (1837–1897)	Fanny Crowninshield (1839–1911)	John Quincy Adams II (1833–1894)
B.B. Crowninshield (1867–1948)	Frederick Josiah Bradlee Sr. (1866–1951)	Helen Suzette Crowninshield (1868–1941)	Frank Crowninshield (1872–1947)	Harriet Sears Crowninshield (1869–1905)	George Caspar Adams (1863–1900)	Charles Francis Adams III (1866–1954)
Frederick Josiah Bradlee Jr. (1892–1970)	Josephine de Gersdorff (1896–1975)	Constance Crowninshield Coolidge (1892–1973)	Ray Atherton (1883–1960)
Jean Saltonstall (1921–2011)	Ben Bradlee (1921–2014)	Sally Quinn (1941–)
Martha Raddatz (1953–)	Benjamin Bradlee Jr. (1948–)	Quinn Bradlee (1982–)
