= Benjamin W. Crowninshield =

American army officer

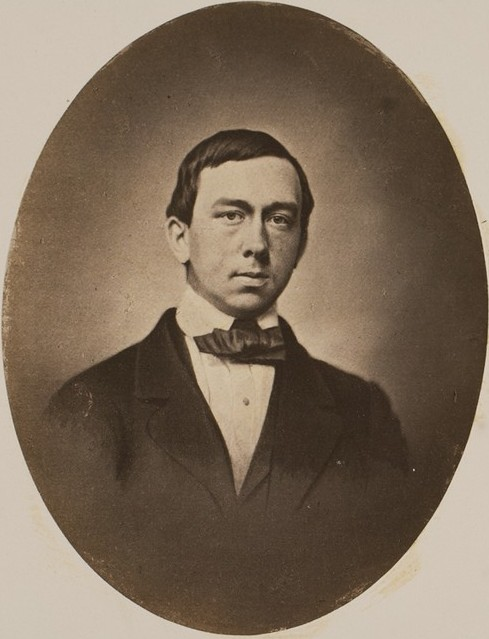
- Born: 12 March 1837
- Died: 16 January 1892 (aged 54)

Benjamin Williams Crowninshield (March 12, 1837–January 16, 1892) was an American historian, businessman, and Union Army officer during the American Civil War.

== Life ==
A member of the Boston Brahmin Crowninshield family, Benjamin Williams Crowninshield was born in Boston, the son of Francis Boardman Crowninshield (1809–1877) and Sarah Putnam (1810–1880). He attended Harvard College, graduating in 1858, along with classmates Henry Hobson Richardson and Henry Adams. Adams' Education of Henry Adams (1918) includes descriptions of his friendship with Crowninshield.

At Harvard, Crowninshield kept a daily diary through his junior and senior years, which was published in 1941 by his son Francis, under the title A Private Journal, 1856–1858. It records that he was captain of the rowing team; handled most of his classes with ease, with the exception of Logic which he called "that cursed nonsense"; was president, Learoyd Director, and Abercrombie Treasurer of the Glee Club; was a member of the Porcellian Club and Pierian Sodality; was treasurer of the Hasty Pudding; sang in the choir; and played the 'cello. He resided, in 1856, at Number 9 Hollis Hall. His diary records many activities, from visiting old friends through attending drawing courses and music lessons; going to dances, theatres, and concerts; playing billiards at Ripley's; and spending the evening in Parker's Restaurant; to spending a whole day making a model boat.

Other people that he befriended at Harvard, according to his diary, include Robert Gould Shaw, whom Crowninshield first met when Shaw was a freshman who was hoping to become a member of the Pierian Sodality, and William Henry Fitzhugh Lee, son of Robert E. Lee. His diary entry for November 19, 1856, for example, records him playing whist "till the sociable (Lee's) was ready at L. Erving's room". (The "sociable" was a party.) Its entry for June 24, 1857 records him going "into town to a supper at Parker's given in honor of Lee, Jones, Lowndes all of whom are going to leave the class".

=== Civil War service ===
With the onset of the Civil War, Crowninshield enlisted as a lieutenant with the First Massachusetts Cavalry on November 11, 1861. He rose through the ranks, being promoted to first lieutenant on December 19, 1861, captain on March 26, 1862, and major on August 10, 1864. He was aide de camp to General Philip Sheridan, remaining with the General until mustered out on November 6, 1864. On June 17, 1865, he reached the highest rank that he was to attain, brevet colonel of the U.S. Volunteers.

Crowninshield was the provost marshal on duty at the time W.H.F. Lee, by then a cavalry general in the Confederate States Army, was captured after the Battle of Brandy Station in June 1863. Crowninshield's son Francis was later to record that it was "a truly embarrassing position for both of them", with Lee rejecting "any of the privileges [that] Crowninshield tried to bestow upon him".

After the war he became a member of the Military Order of the Loyal Legion of the United States - a military society of officers who had served in the Union armed forces.

=== Post war ===
Crowninshield pursued the study of history, publishing and speaking on various topics, such as yachting and military history. He wrote his History of the First Massachusetts Cavalry (see further reading) in 1891. His personal account of Sheridan at Winchester (also listed in further reading) was published in Atlantic Monthly.

In 1868, Crowninshield commissioned his friend H.H. Richardson to design and build a house on Marlborough Street in the newly land-filled Back Bay area of Boston. The Crowninshield House, completed in 1870, still exists.

After the War, Crowninshield married and moved to New York, where he was a member of New York drygoods merchants Sprague, Colburn, and Company. In 1868 he moved to Boston to join a different drygood merchants, Wheelwright, Anderson, and Company. He was later president of the Realty Company.

His health began to fail in 1891, and he died January 16, 1892, at age 54, in Rome, having travelled to Europe for a rest. His oldest son was boat designer Bowdoin B. Crowninshield (1867–1948).

== Family tree ==
Crowninshield-Bradlee family tree

Benjamin Williams Crowninshield (1772–1851)
Francis Boardman Crowninshield (1809–1877)	Jonathan Mason Warren (1811–1867)	Annie G. Crowninshield (1815–1905)	Edward A. Crowninshield (1817–1859)	George Casper Crowninshield (1810–1857)
Benjamin W. Crowninshield (1837–1892)	Alice Crowninshield (1839–1902)	Josiah Bradlee III (1837–1902)	Frederic Crowninshield (1845–1918)	Caspar Crowninshield (1837–1897)	Fanny Crowninshield (1839–1911)	John Quincy Adams II (1833–1894)
B.B. Crowninshield (1867–1948)	Frederick Josiah Bradlee I (1866–1951)	Helen Suzette Crowninshield (1868–1941)	Frank Crowninshield (1872–1947)	Harriet Sears Crowninshield (1869–1905)	George Caspar Adams (1863–1900)	Charles Francis Adams III (1866–1954)
Frederick Josiah Bradlee Jr. (1892–1970)	Josephine de Gersdorff (1896–1975)	Constance Crowninshield Coolidge (1892–1973)	Ray Atherton (1883–1960)
Jean Saltonstall (1921–2011)	Ben Bradlee (1921–2014)	Sally Quinn (1941–)
Martha Raddatz (1953–)	Benjamin Bradlee Jr. (1948–)	Quinn Bradlee (1982–)
