= Caspar Crowninshield =

Volunteer officer in the Union Army

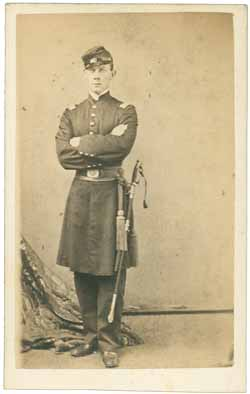
- Born: October 23, 1837; Boston, Massachusetts
- Died: January 10, 1897 (age 59); Boston, Massachusetts
- Burial place: Christ Church (Sears Memorial Chapel); Brookline, Massachusetts
- Military career
- Allegiance: United States of America; Union
- Branch: United States Army; Union Army
- Service years: 1861 – 1865
- Rank: Colonel; Brevet Brigadier General
- Unit: 20th Massachusetts Infantry Regiment
- Commands: 2nd Massachusetts Cavalry Regiment; Reserve Bde, 1st Div, Cavalry Corps, Army of the Shenandoah; 1st Div, Cavalry Corps, Army of the Shenandoah
- Conflicts: American Civil War: Battle of Ball's Bluff; Battle of Antietam

Caspar Crowninshield (October 23, 1837 – January 10, 1897) was a volunteer officer in the Union Army during the American Civil War.

== Early life and education ==
Caspar Crowninshield was born into one of Boston's elite families. The Crowninshields were known for their wealth and success in shipbuilding and maritime trade. Members of the family also held significant political positions. Caspar's grandfather, Benjamin Crowninshield had served as Secretary of the Navy under Presidents James Madison and James Monroe.

Crowninshield entered Harvard College in 1856. His roommate was Robert Gould Shaw who would go on to be the colonel of the famed 54th Massachusetts Infantry—the first African-American infantry regiment. After graduating in 1860, Crowninshield spent a short time employed in the family mercantile business. The start of the Civil War interrupted his business career as Crowninshield sought out an officer's commission.

== Civil War service ==
Crowninshield started the war as a private in the 4th Battalion of Massachusetts Militia. He became captain of the 20th Regiment of Massachusetts Volunteer Infantry on August 18, 1861. He transferred to the 1st Massachusetts Volunteer Cavalry as a captain on November 28, 1861. He was promoted to major of the 2nd Regiment of Massachusetts Volunteer Cavalry on January 31, 1863, and became lieutenant colonel on March 18, 1864. He was promoted to colonel of the regiment on November 18, 1864. He was intermittently commander of the Reserve Brigade of the 1st Division of the Cavalry Corps of the Army of the Shenandoah between October 19, 1864, and February 10, 1865, when Colonel, and in December, Brigadier General, Alfred Gibbs was in command of the 2nd Brigade or for brief periods, in command of the division.

Crowninshield temporarily commanded the division for five days at the end of January 1865. Crowninshield was mustered out of the volunteers on June 16, 1865. On February 21, 1866, President Andrew Johnson nominated Crowninshield for the award of the honorary grade of brevet brigadier general to rank from March 13, 1865. The United States Senate confirmed the award on April 10, 1866.

After the war, Crowninshield was elected as a companion of the Massachusetts Commandery of the Military Order of the Loyal Legion of the United States.

== Post-war life ==
Crowninshield was described as a "gentleman of leisure" after the war. He died on January 10, 1897, at Boston, Massachusetts. He was buried in Christ Church (Sears Memorial Chapel) Brookline, Massachusetts.

== Family tree ==
Crowninshield-Bradlee family tree

Benjamin Williams Crowninshield (1772–1851)
Francis Boardman Crowninshield (1809–1877)	Jonathan Mason Warren (1811–1867)	Annie G. Crowninshield (1815–1905)	Edward A. Crowninshield (1817–1859)	George Casper Crowninshield (1810–1857)
Benjamin W. Crowninshield (1837–1892)	Alice Crowninshield (1839–1902)	Josiah Bradlee III (1837–1902)	Frederic Crowninshield (1845–1918)	Caspar Crowninshield (1837–1897)	Fanny Crowninshield (1839–1911)	John Quincy Adams II (1833–1894)
B.B. Crowninshield (1867–1948)	Frederick Josiah Bradlee Sr. (1866–1951)	Helen Suzette Crowninshield (1868–1941)	Frank Crowninshield (1872–1947)	Harriet Sears Crowninshield (1869–1905)	George Caspar Adams (1863–1900)	Charles Francis Adams III (1866–1954)
Frederick Josiah Bradlee Jr. (1892–1970)	Josephine de Gersdorff (1896–1975)	Constance Crowninshield Coolidge (1892–1973)	Ray Atherton (1883–1960)
Jean Saltonstall (1921–2011)	Ben Bradlee (1921–2014)	Sally Quinn (1941–)
Martha Raddatz (1953–)	Benjamin Bradlee Jr. (1948–)	Quinn Bradlee (1982–)

== See also ==
- List of Massachusetts generals in the American Civil War
- Massachusetts in the American Civil War
- Battle of Gettysburg
