= Frank Crowninshield =

American editor, art and theater critic (1872–1947)

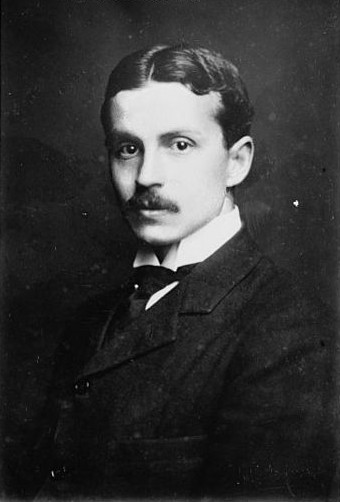
Frank Crowninshield

Francis Welch Crowninshield (June 24, 1872 – December 28, 1947) was an American journalist and art and theater critic best known for developing and editing the magazine Vanity Fair for 21 years, making it a pre-eminent literary journal.

== Personal life ==
Crowninshield was born June 24, 1872, in Paris, France, to the Americans Frederic Crowninshield (1845–1918) and his wife, the former Helen Suzette Fairbanks, whom he later called "poor but good" members of the well-heeled Boston Brahmin Crowninshield family. His father, a man of "independent means", was a poet and a respected painter of landscape and murals. He served for two years as director of the American Academy in Rome.

As an adult, Crowninshield lived in New York City, where he was active in the "high-class" social life, as well as an associate of rising artists and writers. He was a member of the exclusive Knickerbocker Club and Union Club. He was also a member of the Dutch Treat Club from 1937 to 1947 and served as one of its vice presidents. An award given by the club in his name was given to Arthur Rubinstein in 1954.

Crowninshield never married.

== Vanity Fair ==
In 1914, Crowninshield – who Vanity Fair later said was considered "the most cultivated, elegant, and endearing man in publishing, if not Manhattan" – was hired by his friend Condé Nast to become editor of the new Vanity Fair. Crowninshield immediately dropped the magazine's fashion elements and helped turn the periodical into a preeminent literary voice of sophisticated American society, a position it held until 1935.

During his tenure as editor, Crowninshield attracted the best writers of the era. Aldous Huxley, T. S. Eliot, Ferenc Molnár, Gertrude Stein, and Djuna Barnes, all appeared in the issue of July 1923, while some of F. Scott Fitzgerald's earliest works were published in the magazine. Crowninshield bought Dorothy Parker's first published poem for the magazine, and it was also the first periodical in the United States to print reproductions of works by artists such as Picasso and Matisse.

Crowninshield revised the magazine's policies on advertising. In 1915, Vanity Fair published more pages of ads than any other magazine in the country, but the number dwindled under Crowninshield's editorship. The magazine lost valuable revenue, especially during and following the Great Depression, when businesses purchased fewer ads in any case.

== Other work ==
Crowninshield remained active in the arts and high society. He often advised the affluent on art investments and helped develop younger artists of the period, including Clara Tice. He built his own art collection as well, including a large assortment of African and modern French art.

Crowninshield was widely published outside Vanity Fair, including in Vogue, for which he later served as an editor, and The Century Magazine, where he had been an art critic.

According to Sybil Gordon Kantor in her book Alfred H. Barr, Jr. and the Intellectual Origins of the Museum of Modern Art, Crowninshield along with several others was a founding member trustee.

== Post-career ==
After his retirement, Crowninshield began to sell most of his private art collection. In 1943, he sold a total of 1019 items, earning a total of $181,747. His collection had included pieces from Impressionist and Modern artists such as Jules Pascin, Manet, Degas, Renoir, Segonzac and others.

Crowninshield died December 28, 1947, in New York at the age of 75. The New York Times credited Crowninshield with developing "café society" in the United States and noted his long editorship at Vanity Fair. He was buried at Mount Auburn Cemetery in Cambridge, Massachusetts.

== In popular culture ==
- The film Mrs. Parker and the Vicious Circle (1994) featured Crowninshield played by the author and screenwriter Peter Benchley, grandson of Robert Benchley.

== Family tree ==
Crowninshield-Bradlee family tree

Benjamin Williams Crowninshield (1772–1851)
Francis Boardman Crowninshield (1809–1877)	Jonathan Mason Warren (1811–1867)	Annie G. Crowninshield (1815–1905)	Edward A. Crowninshield (1817–1859)	George Casper Crowninshield (1810–1857)
Benjamin W. Crowninshield (1837–1892)	Alice Crowninshield (1839–1902)	Josiah Bradlee III (1837–1902)	Frederic Crowninshield (1845–1918)	Caspar Crowninshield (1837–1897)	Fanny Crowninshield (1839–1911)	John Quincy Adams II (1833–1894)
B.B. Crowninshield (1867–1948)	Frederick Josiah Bradlee Sr. (1866–1951)	Helen Suzette Crowninshield (1868–1941)	Frank Crowninshield (1872–1947)	Harriet Sears Crowninshield (1869–1905)	George Caspar Adams (1863–1900)	Charles Francis Adams III (1866–1954)
Frederick Josiah Bradlee Jr. (1892–1970)	Josephine de Gersdorff (1896–1975)	Constance Crowninshield Coolidge (1892–1973)	Ray Atherton (1883–1960)
Jean Saltonstall (1921–2011)	Ben Bradlee (1921–2014)	Sally Quinn (1941–)
Martha Raddatz (1953–)	Benjamin Bradlee Jr. (1948–)	Quinn Bradlee (1982–)
