= Frederic Crowninshield =

American painter (1845–1918)

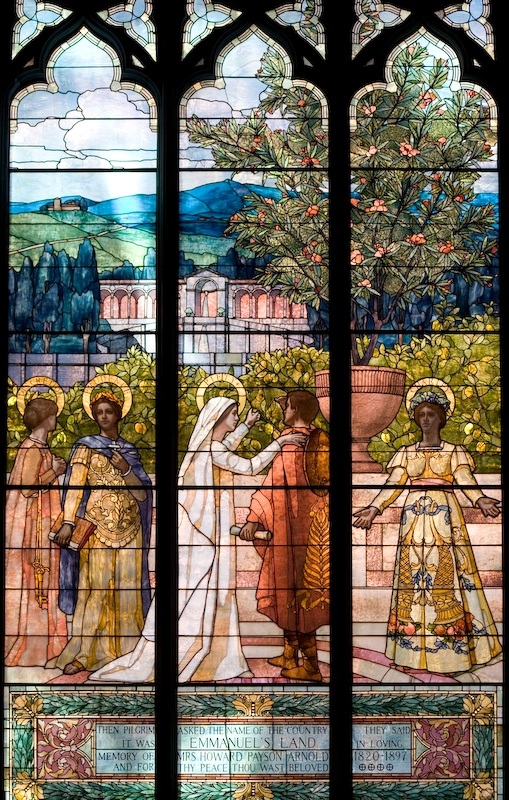
Emmanuel's Land Window depicts a scene from John Bunyan's Pilgrim's Progress, at the Emmanuel Episcopal Church, Boston

Frederic Crowninshield (1845–1918) was an American artist and author.

== Life ==
Crowninshield was born in Boston on November 27, 1845, into the Crowninshield family. His father was Edward Augustus Crowninshield (1817–1859) and mother was Caroline Maria Welch (1820–1897). He had two older brothers: Francis W. Crowninshield was born in 1843, and died from wounds in the American Civil War in 1866. Brother Edward Augustus Crowninshield was born in 1841 and died a year later.

After his father died his mother married Howard Payson Arnold in 1869.

Crowninshield graduated at Harvard College in 1866, and studied abroad 11 years; under Thomas Leeson Rowbotham in London, Thomas Couture in Italy, and Alexandre Cabanel in Paris. From 1879 to 1885 he taught at the Museum of Fine Arts School of Drawing and Painting when it was housed in the basement of the Museum of Fine Arts, Boston in Copley Square.

Crowninshield then moved to New York, where he was the first president of the National Society of Mural Painters a position that he held from 1895 to 1899. , and president of the Fine Arts Federation from 1900 to 1909. In 1911 he was appointed director of the American Academy in Rome.

One of his best-known works is a stained-glass window depicting John Bunyan's The Pilgrim's Progress, entitled "Emmanuel's Land", at the Emmanuel Episcopal Church, Boston. He designed the window in 1899 and dedicated it to his mother.

On October 24, 1867, he married Helen Suzette Fairbanks, daughter of William Nelson Fairbanks and Augusta Reed. They had three children. Helen Suzette Crowninshield was born in Paris July 28, 1868, and married Carl August de Gersdorff on September 18, 1895. Edward Augustus Crowninshield was born at Rome April 7, 1870. Son Francis Welch Crowninshield, known as "Frank", was born on June 24, 1872.

He died September 13, 1918, in Capri, Italy.

== Family tree ==
Crowninshield-Bradlee family tree

Benjamin Williams Crowninshield (1772–1851)
Francis Boardman Crowninshield (1809–1877)	Jonathan Mason Warren (1811–1867)	Annie G. Crowninshield (1815–1905)	Edward A. Crowninshield (1817–1859)	George Casper Crowninshield (1810–1857)
Benjamin W. Crowninshield (1837–1892)	Alice Crowninshield (1839–1902)	Josiah Bradlee III (1837–1902)	Frederic Crowninshield (1845–1918)	Caspar Crowninshield (1837–1897)	Fanny Crowninshield (1839–1911)	John Quincy Adams II (1833–1894)
B.B. Crowninshield (1867–1948)	Frederick Josiah Bradlee Sr. (1866–1951)	Helen Suzette Crowninshield (1868–1941)	Frank Crowninshield (1872–1947)	Harriet Sears Crowninshield (1869–1905)	George Caspar Adams (1863–1900)	Charles Francis Adams III (1866–1954)
Frederick Josiah Bradlee Jr. (1892–1970)	Josephine de Gersdorff (1896–1975)	Constance Crowninshield Coolidge (1892–1973)	Ray Atherton (1883–1960)
Jean Saltonstall (1921–2011)	Ben Bradlee (1921–2014)	Sally Quinn (1941–)
Martha Raddatz (1953–)	Benjamin Bradlee Jr. (1948–)	Quinn Bradlee (1982–)

== Works ==
His writings include:

- Mural Painting (1887)
- Pictoris Carmina (1900)
- A Painter's Moods (1902)
- Tales in Metre (1903)
