= Jacob Crowninshield =

American politician (1770–1808)

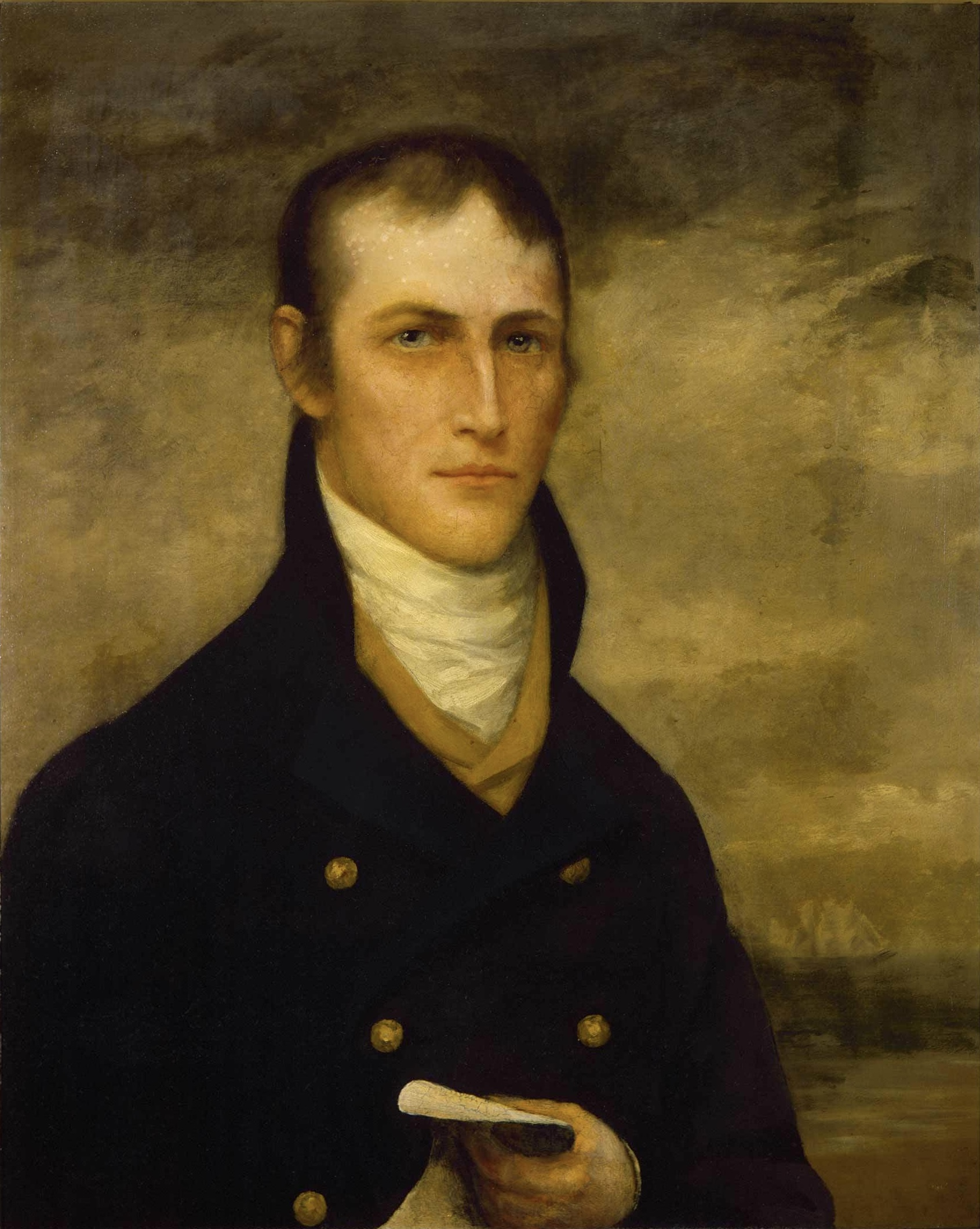
- Posthumous portrait by Robert Cutler Hinckley, c. 1880

Member of the U.S. House of Representatives from Massachusetts's 2nd district
- In office March 4, 1803 – April 15, 1808
- Preceded by: William Shepard
- Succeeded by: Joseph Story

Member of the Massachusetts Senate
- In office 1801

Personal details
- Born: March 31, 1770 Salem, Province of Massachusetts Bay, British America
- Died: April 15, 1808 (aged 38) Washington, D.C., U.S.
- Resting place: Harmony Grove Cemetery, Salem, Massachusetts
- Party: Democratic-Republican
- Relations: Benjamin Williams Crowninshield, Arent S. Crowninshield
- Children: Sarah Crowninshield

Jacob Crowninshield (March 31, 1770 – April 15, 1808) was an American politician who served as a U.S. representative from Massachusetts and was an appointee to the position of U.S. secretary of the Navy, which he never filled. His brother Benjamin Williams Crowninshield did successfully hold the post; the Crowninshield family in general was prominent in early American maritime affairs. He was the grandfather of Arent S. Crowninshield.

== Biography ==
Jacob Crowninshield was born March 31, 1770, in Salem in the Province of Massachusetts Bay. As a young man, he went into partnership with three of his brothers commanding trade ships between the United States and India.

In 1796, Crowninshield married Sarah Gardner, daughter of John (a direct descendant of an old planter) and Sarah (Derby, daughter of Richard (1712–1783)). Their daughter Sarah later married the Salem merchant Richard Saltonstall Rogers.

Crowninshield was an unsuccessful candidate for election to Congress in 1798, to fill the vacancy caused by the resignation of Dwight Foster, but was elected to the Massachusetts Senate in 1801.

In November 1802, he was elected as a Democratic-Republican to Congress and served in the 8th, 9th and 10th Congresses. During the 9th Congress, he was chairman of the United States House Committee on Commerce and Manufactures. He died of tuberculosis in Washington, D.C., on April 15, 1808, near the end of his third term. Crowninshield was 38 years old at the time of his death.

In 1805, Crowninshield was nominated to the position of U.S. Secretary of the Navy by President Thomas Jefferson, and was confirmed by the Senate, but he declined to take up the position for health reasons, and continued to serve in Congress.

Crowninshield is buried in Harmony Grove Cemetery in his hometown of Salem.

== See also ==
- List of members of the United States Congress who died in office (1790–1899)

== Footnotes ==
U.S. House of Representatives
Preceded by William Shepard	Member of the U.S. House of Representatives from Massachusetts's 2nd congressional district March 4, 1803 – April 15, 1808	Succeeded by Joseph Story
