= Francis Boardman Crowninshield =

American yachtsman

Francis (Frank) Boardman Crowninshield
- Born: April 22, 1869; New York City, New York
- Died: May 19, 1950 (aged 81); Wilmington, Delaware
- Education: St. Paul's School; Harvard University (1891)
- Spouse: Louise E. du Pont (m. 1900)
- Family: Crowninshield family

Francis (Frank) Boardman Crowninshield (April 22, 1869 – May 19, 1950) was an international yachtsman and the husband of Louise Evelina du Pont. He was an amateur painter and writer and was also interested in architecture and design, and boat racing.

== Biography ==
Crowninshield was born in New York City on April 22, 1869. He was a member of the Crowninshield family from Salem, Massachusetts. Crowninshield attended St. Paul's School in Concord, New Hampshire and graduated from Harvard University in 1891. He rode with Troop K of Theodore Roosevelt's Rough Riders during the Spanish–American War in 1898 and saw combat in the Cuban campaign in the Battle of San Juan Hill.

On June 28, 1900, he married Louise du Pont. The couple were married for fifty years and did not have children. During their married life, they traveled back and forth between their three primary residences: Seaside Farm, in Marblehead, Massachusetts; Eleutherian Mills, in Wilmington, Delaware; and Las Olas, in Boca Grande, Florida.

Crowninshield was a professional yachtsman all his life and many of the trophies he won were on display at the Eastern Yacht Club in Marblehead, Massachusetts at the time of his death, including one he and his team won in a race in Spain. His family at one time owned an oceangoing yacht called Cleopatra's Barge, about which Crowninshield published a book in 1913.

In addition to writing, Crowninshield also liked to sketch and paint in watercolors. His subject matter was typically the homes and gardens of his three residences. In 1944, the Ferargil Galleries in New York City held an exhibit of his work.

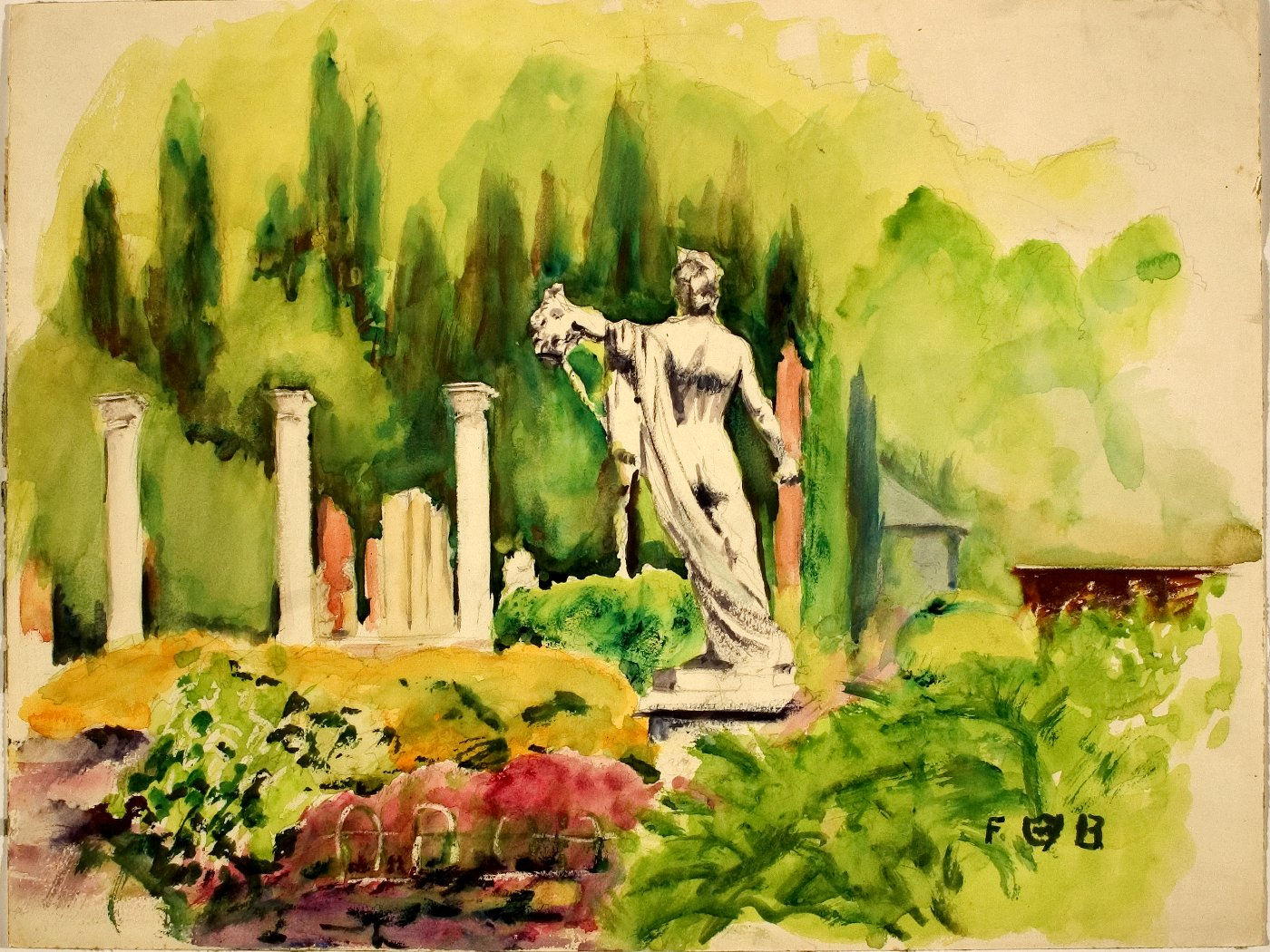
Crowninshield Garden, by Frank Crowninshield, c. 1930s, Hagley Museum and Library, Wilmington, DE

Even though Crowninshield and his wife only spent a couple months out of the year at their home in Delaware, he devoted a lot of his time researching and traveling overseas studying gardens and neoclassicism in order to create Crowninshield Gardens, a garden of neoclassical ruins on top of the Eleutherian Mills site that had been ruined by time and neglect.

Crowninshield died on May 19, 1950, at the age of 81 at Eleutherian Mills. He is buried in Wilmington, Delaware.

== See also ==
- Hagley Museum and Library
- Winterthur Museum, Garden and Library
