= Cleopatra's Barge =

American oceangoing yacht in 1800s

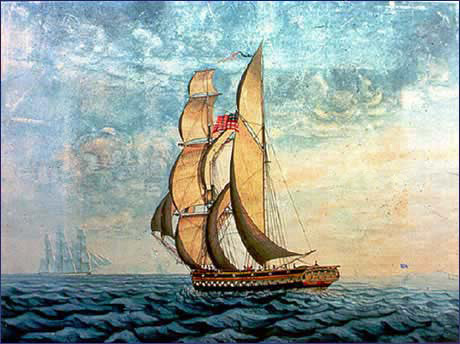
- 1818 painting by George Ropes in Peabody Essex Museum

History

United States
- Name: Cleopatra's Barge
- Owner: George Crowninshield Jr.
- Builder: Retire Becket; Salem, Massachusetts
- Cost: $100,000 (including furnishings)
- Launched: October 21, 1816
- Completed: December 1816
- Out of service: November 1817

Hawaii
- Acquired: November 16, 1820
- Renamed: Haʻaheo o Hawaiʻi; ("Pride of Hawaii")
- Fate: Wrecked 1824

General characteristics
- Tons burthen: 192 tons bm
- Length: 100 ft (30.5 m) (deck); 83 ft (25 m) (water line)
- Beam: 23 ft (7.0 m)
- Draught: 11 ft (3.4 m)
- Propulsion: Sails
- Sail plan: Hermaphrodite brig

Cleopatra's Barge was the first oceangoing yacht built in the United States. It was built in 1816 at Salem, Massachusetts by shipbuilder Retire Becket for owner George Crowninshield Jr. Crowninshield died in 1817 after a single pleasure voyage to the Mediterranean; his brother Richard bought it, used it for two coastal trading voyages, and then sold it to Boston China traders Bryant & Sturgis and Capt. John Suter in early 1820. Suter sailed it to Hawaiʻi and sold it to Prince Liloliho for slightly more than a million pounds of sandalwood. Liholiho used it as his private yacht, renaming it Haʻaheo o Hawaiʻi ("Pride of Hawaii") in 1822 after a rebuild. Under an all-Hawaiian crew, Ha'aheo wrecked in Hanalei Bay, Kaua'i, Hawai'i in April 1824.

== Building ==
In the 18th century the Crowninshield family of Salem, Massachusetts had a thriving shipping business. In the American Revolution and War of 1812, many of the family merchant vessels were converted to privateers, and the family made huge fortunes. The elder George Crowninshield (born in 1733) died in 1815, and his five sons inherited the business. Eldest son George Crowninshield Jr. (1766–1817) commissioned a pleasure yacht originally called the ship Car of Concordia. At registration he renamed it Cleopatra's Barge for the pleasure barge of Egyptian Queen Cleopatra VII, based on a passage in the play Antony and Cleopatra. It was built by Retire Becket of Salem and launched October 21, 1816. At a time when all American ships were either merchant or naval vessels, the concept of a pleasure yacht was unique.

Cleopatra's Barge was 83 feet (25 m) long at the waterline, 23 feet (7.0 m) wide, and weighed 192 tons. It had two masts in the configuration known as a hermaphrodite brig: square-rigged forward and schooner-rigged aft. This made it fast but required a relatively small crew. It cost about US$50,000 to build, and about the same amount was spent for fitting out and luxury furnishings. The main cabin was 19 feet (5.8 m) by 20 feet (6.1 m), with mahogany panels inlaid with other decorative wood. Furniture was covered in red velvet with gold lace, and the kitchen included custom silver, china, and formal glassware. The starboard side was painted in colorful horizontal stripes, and the port side a herring-bone pattern. It even boasted indoor plumbing.

On December 6, 1816, the ship was opened for public tours, and it became a popular attraction for thousands of people. After a one-day trial sail, an unusually cold winter froze the ship into dock for the winter. On January 14, 1817, the Salem Gazette reported:

"The elegant equipment of this vessel, by Mr. Crowninshield, for a voyage of pleasure, as it is an entire novelty in this country, has excited universal curiosity and admiration."

== Atlantic ==
Starting on March 30, 1817, it became the first American pure pleasure craft to sail across the Atlantic. The owner's brother Benjamin Williams Crowninshield was United States Secretary of the Navy, so provided letters of introduction from Secretary of State James Monroe and Ambassador to Great Britain John Quincy Adams. Adams' grandson John Quincy Adams II would later marry George Crowninshield Jr.'s grandniece.

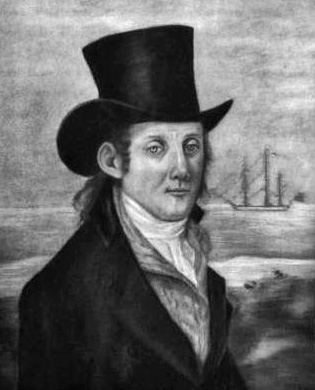
Captain Benjamin Crowninshield

An older cousin Benjamin Crowninshield (1758–1836), former lieutenant of the privateer Black Watch during the American Revolution and commanding officer of the privateer Alexander during the War of 1812, was master of the ship. He brought his son Benjamin Crowninshield Jr. (1782–1864) who kept a log book including sketches and watercolors recording the journey. On a six-month cruise in the Mediterranean, large crowds of up to 8,000 individuals gathered to tour the yacht at each port. They reached Faial Island (which they called Fayal) in the Azores, April 24 where the American Consul gave a ball in their honor. Then they visited Funchal on the island of Madeira, Gibraltar, Málaga and other ports on the southern coast of Spain. In Marseille the ship was repainted and redecorated. Next stops were Toulon in France and Genoa in Italy where they met astronomer Franz Xaver von Zach.

It was widely suspected that the Crowninshields were planning to free former Emperor Napoléon Bonaparte from his exile on Saint Helena island back to America. There were numerous supporting episodes. On 16 August 1814, Alexander had recaptured the British prize Invincible Napoleon, which the British ultimately recaptured. (They also captured Alexander.) The Crowninshields visited several of Napoleon's supporters and relatives on the island of Elba where Napoléon had escaped in 1815. In Rome they met with Napoleon's mother Letizia Ramolino, and siblings Prince Lucien and Princess Pauline. They took on board the captain of the ship on which Napoleon escaped Elba and his doctor, along with souvenirs such as a pair of Napoléon's boots and an imperial snuffbox. They were at various times shadowed by ships from the French, British, and American Navies, as well as pirates. Crowninshield outran them all in informal races that predate any organized yacht racing. It was also rumored he was hoping to bring back a European princess to marry, but he returned with neither wife nor Emperor.

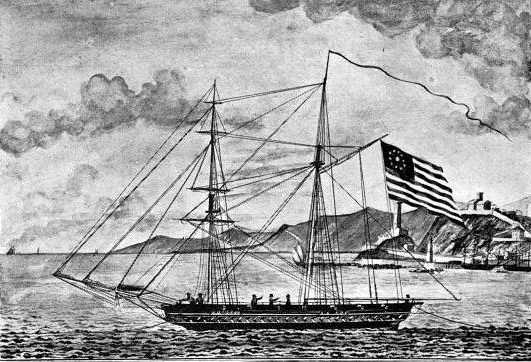
In the Harbor of Genoa, Italy

After arriving back in Salem from his first cruise October 3, George Crowninshield Jr. died suddenly on November 26, 1817, aboard the ship planning his next adventure. Some of the furnishings were removed and eventually placed in what later became the Peabody Essex Museum. The Barge was auctioned off to a Crowninshield brother for US$15,400 in July 1818 and used for a few trading voyages. Boston merchants William Sturgis and John Bryant bought the ship in April 1820. Although Bostonians assumed it was going to be used as a trading vessel (and it was stuffed with cargo), the owners had another plan. It sailed via South America under Captain John Suter (1781-1852) in June 1820, who had instructions to try to sell it in the Kingdom of Hawaii, then known as the "Sandwich Islands".

== Pacific ==
Just before landing the ship was cleaned up and painted. Suter had been to the Hawaiian Islands on several previous trips, and as he suspected, the day after he arrived on November 6, 1820 King Kamehameha II inspected the ship and was impressed. The ancient Hawaiians had keen interest in boats, and the young king knew his father Kamehameha the Great used Western military technology such as large armed ships to conquer the islands.

On November 16, 1820, the price was negotiated as 8000 piculs of sandalwood (over a million pounds), estimated to be worth about US$80,000 at the time. Kamehameha II was quite proud of his ship; in the words of Charles Bullard, the agent for Sturgis and Bryant at the time:

"If you want to know how Religion stands at the Islands I can tell you — All sects are tolerated but the King worships the Barge."

Various captains of the ship in Hawaii included the king's French secretary Jean-Baptiste Rives (1793–1833), known as "John Rives", Scotsman Captain Alexander Adams, Hawaiian Prime Minister Kalanimoku, and Hawaiian Naihe-Kukui Kapihe known as "Captain Jack". The yacht was equipped with cannons fired for ceremonial salutes. On its nighttime arrival to Honolulu, the noise and flashes from its blasts and the responding welcoming volleys from the fort caused an uproar of frightened people and barking dogs. An observer called it "a combination of the sublime and the ludicrous not soon to be forgotten".

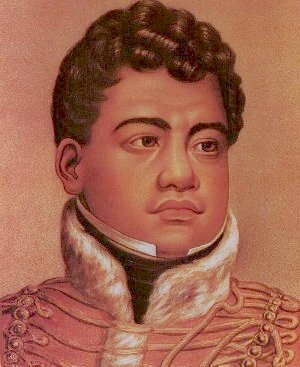
King Kamehameha II known as "Liholiho"

In July 1821 Kamehameha II set out in a small open boat for what was thought to be a short trip near Honolulu. Instead he insisted on going to the island of Kauaʻi across a rough open sea. The ruler of the island, Kaumualiʻi, sent his own boat back to tell the rest of the court the king's whereabouts; the king's five wives and chiefs took the royal yacht to Kauaʻi. For two weeks, Kamehameha toured the island while entertaining Kaumualiʻi and the rest of the court on his yacht. On the evening of September 16, Kamehameha II suddenly ordered his crew to set sail quietly for Oʻahu, effectively forcing Kaumualiʻi into exile.

Russian visitors noted an African servant offering a choice of rum, brandy, gin, or wine. This might have been the same William Chapman who served as the yacht's cook for the Crowninshields, and claimed to have also worked for Captain James Cook who was killed in Hawaii in 1779. Chapman was described as an expert navigator via lunar observations.

On April 18, 1822, it was discovered that much of the wood in the ship was already rotting. Some historians think that Sturgis and Bryant knew about the decay, and thus were eager for quick payment. The king threatened to stop his payments of sandalwood (he might have been running behind in his deliveries already). It was hauled out of the water and rebuilt. Captain Thomas Meek was hired to replace the rotting wood, after a trip to the Pacific Northwest to obtain lumber. Meek returned in November 1822 and worked on the ship through the Spring of 1823. It was re-launched on May 10, 1823, renamed Haʻaheo o Hawaiʻi ("Pride of Hawaii").

On May 28, 1823, the royal court and missionaries William Richards and Charles Stewart sailed from Honolulu to Maui. The king seems to have given free passage for missionaries many times on the yacht between islands, which might explain why they tolerated his heavy drinking. Missionaries also enjoyed holding services on board, noting the acoustics for hymns were better than in thatched huts they otherwise used.

By November 1823 Kamehameha II decided he would go to visit the King of Great Britain. Although it was suggested to use the royal yacht, a whaling ship called L'Aigle was used since the crew would be more familiar with the route. Kamehameha II died while waiting for an audience with King George IV and would never see his yacht again.

On April 6, 1824, in Hanalei Bay, on the northern coast of Kauaʻi island Haʻaheo o Hawaiʻi ran the aground on a shallow reef. A recent theory for why the ship was in such a remote area was that it was on a scouting expedition, investigating plans for the rumored rebellion that would take place a few months later led by Kaumualiʻi's son Humehume. Although this theory gives retribution for Kaumualiʻi's capture as a motive for potential sabotage, the missionaries blamed the wreck on the frequent drunkenness of the crew. Hiram Bingham I took the opportunity to preach a sermon on temperance to the crowd gathered at the site.

The Hawaiians used their bare hands to make three enormous ropes out of braids of local vegetation. They tied the cables to the main mast of the ship, and planned to roll it across the reef. While joining together in song they tugged in unison, rotating the ship back to an upright position. The mast then snapped off and the rigging fell into the sea. Before another attempt could be made, word came that Kaumualiʻi was dying in his exile. The people of Kauaʻi dispersed, and after salvaging any parts they could, the wreck was left to be broken up by the surf.

== Recovery ==
A section of hull washed ashore on December 30, 1844, that was already damaged by shipworms, and two cannon were recovered in 1857. Several tsunamis probably helped disperse the wreckage, and the eye of hurricane Iniki passed directly over Kauaʻi in 1992.

In January 1994 Paul Forsythe Johnston of the Smithsonian Institution's National Museum of American History applied for the first underwater archaeological permits issued by the state of Hawaii to find and investigate the wreckage. Johnston was formerly a curator of the Peabody Museum of Salem (now part of the Peabody Essex Museum). Permits were finally secured, Richard W. Rogers (known as "Captain Rick") volunteered his research vessel Pilialoha outfitted with a proton magnetometer, and in July 1995 the search began. The first season turned up mostly trash that had washed down the river that emptied into the bay. After several years of work, the ship remains were finally located, carefully excavated, and many artifacts were recovered. A section of the stern was uncovered, documented, and re-buried.

An investor proposed to build a replica in 2008. It was estimated that it would take over US$7 million to construct.
