= Spring Pond (Massachusetts) =

Lake in Essex County, Massachusetts, United States

- Location within Massachusetts
- Location: Essex County, Massachusetts
- Coordinates: 42°29′45″N 70°56′49″W
- Basin countries: United States
- Settlements: Lynn, Peabody and Salem, Massachusetts

Spring Pond, United States, (formerly known as "Mineral Spring", "Mineral Pond" and the "little lake of Lynnmere") abuts the three cities of Lynn, Peabody (formerly Danvers) and Salem. In the center of these townships "is a beautiful pond". It is a secluded lake known by residents of the three cities and visitors who come to enjoy the camps, trails and natural environment of the woods. "It is in fact one of the most picturesque and romantic lakelets in Massachusetts". Stretching from Spring Pond to Marlborough Road in Salem, the pond and woods form a microcosm of beauty. On the edge of Spring Pond was once the Fay Farm, an English manor estate in New England. The mansion of Fay Farm was a well-known hotel in 1810, when the springs of these areas were believed to possess medicinal qualities. People visited the springs near Spring Pond to restore health, and worship the goddess Hygeia (Greek: health) and drink from the rusty iron-rich water trickling from the foot of a bank. Later, some traveled there solely for fun and frolic. The hotel was then converted into a private residence. The waters of Spring Pond are conveyed by springs from an aquifer lying below Spring Pond (and its surrounding area) through Peabody, Lynn and Salem. Spring Pond is listed as one of the "Massachusetts Great Ponds".

== History ==
In 1669 (and again in 1793), colonial divisions between townships were drawn using the spring at Spring Pond as the benchmark to create the city boundaries; Spring Pond supplied water to Danvers (now Peabody), Lynn and Salem. In 1669, the spring was used to establish the boundary between Lynn and Salem; in 1793 (when Salem divided, forming another township) the borders were redefined based on the spring. The stone benchmark remains in the water of Spring Pond, engraved with the initials of each township: L (for Lynn), P (for Peabody) and S (for Salem). In 1793 Spring Pond was divided among three towns: Peabody (once Danvers), Salem and Lynn (once Saugus). The spring was the boundary of the colonial division line of the townships. The dividing line left valuable, arable land on one side of the town boundary and separated the Mansion House and buildings in Lynn.

"Lo", a Native American, was killed around 1676 by John Flint, a soldier in the war against King Philip by the Wampanoags, near the pond (at the present border of Lynn and Salem). Legend says that he was the first (and only) Native American killed in the area; his body and bones nourished the shrubs and trees near Spring Pond.

Before 1704, early settlement of the area included Jacob and Elizabeth (John Clifford) Allen of Salem (and their daughter Elizabeth) as recorded landowners near what was then known as Lynn Mineral Spring Pond.

During the Third Plantation of the Massachusetts Bay Colony (in about 1704) John Casper Richter Von Crowninshield (Johannes Kaspar Richter Von Kronenscheldt, as first spelled), a German physician, settled on the hillsides near Spring Pond on land purchased from Elizabeth Allen (partly in Salem and partly in Lynn). Among Crowninshield's descendants were George Crowninshield, who founded the Crowninshield & Sons shipping business and whose family built Crowninshield’s Wharf in Salem. Benjamin Williams Crowninshield served as United States Secretary of the Navy, Representative in Congress, member of the Massachusetts State Senate and House of Representatives, and became one of the first directors of the Merchant's Bank of Salem; he founded East India Trade of Salem, and the USS Crowninshield naval destroyer was named in his honor. George Crowninshield Jr. built and sailed the yacht Cleopatra’s Barge. Louise E. du Pont Crowninshield, wife of Francis Boardman Crowninshield, was one of America's first historical preservationists and a founding member of the National Trust for Historic Preservation.

In 1810 the Twin Springs Hotel (later known as the Mineral Spring Hotel, part of the Crowninshield estate and the Fay Estate Mansion of Lynn) was built near the spring, whose water was rich in iron and believed to possess medicinal qualities. Patients traveled great distances to drink the water and, for a time, to worship the goddess Hygeia to restore their health. This "classical worship" damaged the hotel's reputation, and it was later converted into the private summer residence of Richard Sullivan Fay. From 1847–1865 Fay (an Anglo-American farmer, merchant and manufacturer) lived on a 500-acre (2.0 km^{2}) estate on the hillsides surrounding Spring Pond partly in Lynn (the present Fay Estate), partly in present-day Salem (the present Camp Lion and WalMart, extending to Danvers Road), growing in his arboretum (which was open to the public) a variety of rare and exotic trees and shrubs imported from other parts of the world; many arrived here first in the United States, among them the American tulip tree. Some descendants of Fay's trees and shrubs continue to grow near Spring Pond, although most of the rare trees were cut by a lumber company in 1910. In 1862, Fay commissioned an army at his own expense. Officers and members of the 38th Regiment of Massachusetts named the company the "Fay Light Guard". It was attached to the 39th Massachusetts Regiment and fought at Port Hudson, Cane River, Mansion Plains, Winchester, Fisher’s Hill and Cedar Creek.

== Drinking water ==
The Journal of the Boston Society of Civil Engineers (vol. 3) reported that "In 1851 a 12 in (30 cm) main 1,600 ft (490 m) in length was constructed to bring water by gravity from Spring Pond in Peabody, one of the present sources of supply of that town. This pond is about 40 ft (12 m) above the central portion of Salem".

== Spring Pond in literature ==
The Lynn Mineral Spring is a place of agreeable resort at all seasons of the year. It is a highly picturesque and romantic spot, by the side of an extensive pond, or lake, surrounded by hills and wild woodlands. The first white man who selected this delightful retreat for his residence, was Caspar Van Crawninshield, Esq., a gentleman from Germany, ancestor of the respectable family, of Crowninshields, of Boston. He built a cottage here about the year 1690, and several of the old apple-trees, planted by him, are still standing in the garden. A neat and commodious hotel is open here for the accommodation of boarders and visitors, kept by Mr. Otis King.

— Alonzo Lewis, Lynn's first historian, Register of the Lynn Historical Society, vols. 15–16

I never witnessed any growth that awakened my admiration more. Not withstanding the injuries sustained by fires, and other wanton encroachments, the whole region about the beautiful sheet of water long known as Spring Pond, whose waters supply the city of Salem with elixer of life, is made beautiful by their verdure.

— Samuel W. Cole, historian, writer and educator, The New England Farmer

In the middle of township is a beautiful pond, named Spring Pond.

— Anonymous, Collections of the Massachusetts Historical Society for 1799

The situation is delightful. The little lake, which has received the pretty name of Lynnmere, nestles so cosily and smiles so brightly between the thickly wooded hills that it might also be imagined there had been a compact that is should be shielded from the wild winds that would agitate its bosom, in return for the refreshing exhalations it might send up to renovate the drooping foliage. Upon the western bank, which rises gracefully to a considerable height, was erected, in 1810, the edifice long known as Lynn Mineral Spring Hotel. It was a favorite summer resort; and no inland retreat could be more charming.

— Anonymous, Lynn Historical Society Register, vols. 16–18

The trees were assisted to grow by Mr. Fay in accordance with the divine law, Washington Irving would have said as he did of his transatlantic friend...“He who plants an oak, looks forward to future ages, and plants for prosperity. Nothing can be less selfish than this. He cannot expect to sit in its shade, nor enjoy its shelter; but he exults in the idea that the acorn which he has buried in the earth grow up into a lofty pile, and shall keep on flourishing and increasing and benefiting mankind, long after he shall have ceased to tread his paternal fields.

— Anonymous, Lynn Historical Society Register, vols. 15–16

== Notable residents ==
- Alonzo Lewis: Writer, poet, teacher, reporter, artist, surveyor and Lynn's first historian, was strongly attracted to Spring Pond (or Mineral Spring, as it was then known). Lewis published a drawing and published articles about the Mineral Spring Hotel and its surrounding wooded areas. Lewis wrote The History of Lynn, which was sold in four parts; the third is entitled Lynn Mineral Spring Hotel, or (as modern Lynn calls it) the Fay Estate.
- Casper Van Crowninshield: Owned and settled on the lands near Spring Pond in retreat and for farming. He hailed from Germany; eminent citizens were entertained at his retreat, including Cotton Mather.
- Cotton Mather and his father Increase Mather: Both were visitors to the Spring Pond retreat and the adjacent lands of Casper Van Crowninshield. One of Cotton Mather's works (his memoir of his father) extols the virtues of the Spring Pond area. In it, he describes the healing waters and retreat under the trees of the area. Cotton Mather was a New England Puritan minister, author of more than 450 books, whose writings were influential in the Salem witch trials.
- Elias Trask (Captain John, William Traske): Born in Salem in 1679, of Trask's farm adjoining Spring Pond and Long Pond
- Elizabeth, daughter of Jacob and Elizabeth (Clifford) Allen of Salem, Massachusetts
- James R. Newhall: Writer, literary executor to Alonzo Lewis and one of Lynn's first historians, he was attracted to the Spring Pond region.
- William Bentley: Early 19th-century diarist

== Increase Mather's Diaries of Spring Pond ==
Parentator or Remarkables of Dr. Increase Mather, by Cotton Mather, was published in 1724. In his book, Cotton Mather shares excerpts from the diary of his father, Increase Mather, concerning the latter's recovery from illness due to the healing waters of Mineral Spring Pond (as it was then known). Some excerpts follow:

In the Spring of 1670, he returned unto his Beloved Pulpit: And made his first Sermon on those words: PSal XCIV.12. Blessed is the Man thou Chastenest, O Lord, and teachest out of thy Law. But being still under feeble circumstances, and having a strong impression on his mind, that the drinking of the mineral waters might be of use to him, he took a lodging at Lyn, where he might repair every morning, to a spring there, which was then famous through the country. I will transcribe a passage of two from his diary, which he wrote in the time of his being there.

One is this: "At the Waters, retiring myself under the Trees, I poured out my Soul before the Lord, and then met with Him. I did humbly and believingly (through the Lord's Grace towards me) betake myself unto God, and unto Jesus Christ, for the Healing of my Bodily Distempers. I Believed, Because, though Sin had brought these Distempers on me, yet God had accepted the Sacrifice, which Christ has offered for my Sin. Because also God had formerly heard my Prayers. And because Christ has Redeemed my Body as well as my Soul. Christ intends to bestow Eternal Glory on My Body as well as on my Soul: And therefore He will not deny unto me so small a matter as Bodily Health, which is nothing in comparison of Eternal Glory. Finally, Because I desire Health for the Lord's Sake, and not for my own; even that I may do Service for Him. After Prayer, I went away Inwardly Rejoicing, because I have prevailed! I have Prevailed for Mercy!"

Another is this. "At the Waters. There again the Lord enabled me with Tears, and Perswasion of a Gracious Answer to pour out my Desires before Him for both Bodily and Spiritual Healing to be vouchsafed unto me My dear God in Jesus Christ, will certainly accept of some Service from me: Blessed be His Glorius name forever and ever: Amen! Amen!" It was not long before the Lost Jewel was restored onto me. Nevertheless, in the way to it, he met with many grievous Pangs of Overwhelming Melancholy: of which he also says, "I found the Prayer of Faith to be the best Remedy against it".

But of this also, I will from his diary, only note a couple of passages.

One is this; "As I was returning home from Lyn, at the end of the Town, a poor Godly Woman (whose name is Mansfield) desired those that Rode with me to go forward, for she must needs speak with me. When I stop'd, O Syr, (said she, with much affection, and many Tears) I am troubled at my condition. I am afraid, that I grieve the Good Spirit of God, by not being so cheerful as I ought to be. I am Dejected, and my Soul is Disquieted; And when I meet with afflictions, I lay them too much to Heart; and I doubt, & herein offend, so Gracious a Father, as God has been unto me; a God who has done much for me, and sometimes manifested Himself unto me. I was astonished to hear her speak, and see her come thus to me for some Relief in such Temptation. I concluded that this poor Woman (who little thought so herself) was a Messenger sent from God unto me; For she spoke to my very condition, as if He that knows all things had put Words into her Mouth. Oh! Let the Great Physician of Souls (said I then) Look upon me, and let Him Heal me, and give me Power of Grace to be more than a Conqueror over my Special Infirmities".

— Cotton Mather, Parentator or Remarkables of Dr. Increase Mather

== Bibliography ==
- Quest for Survival: An appreciation of Local Wildflowers, Lynn, Salem & Peabody Massachusetts, by Leslie Courtemanche of Lynn, Massachusetts, an Author of Nature for Spring Pond, Photographer and Conservationist
- Heritage and Habitat Lost: A Collection of Thoughts and Photographs of the Spring Pond, Area of Lynn, Salem and Peabody, Massachusetts, by Leslie Courtemanche of Lynn, Massachusetts, an Author of Nature for Spring Pond, Photographer and Conservationist
- The Register of the Lynn Historical Society, Volumes 16–18, by Lynn Historical Society, Lynn Massachusetts
- Country Arts in Early American Homes, by Nina Fletcher Little
- History of Lynn, Essex County: Massachusetts including Lynnfield ..., Volume 1, by Alonzo Lewis, and James Robinson Newhall
- The History of Salem, Massachusetts, Volume 1, by Sidney Perley
- History of Essex County, Massachusetts: with ..., Volume 1, Issue 1, by Duane Hamilton Hurd
- History of Essex County, Massachusetts: with ..., Volume 2, Part 1, by Duane Hamilton Hurd
- Collections of the Massachusetts Historical Society, by Massachusetts Historical Society
- Collectections of the Massachusetts Historical Society for the Year 1799
- Bulletin of the Essex County Ornithological Club of Massachusetts, Volumes 1–6, by Essex County Ornithological Club of Massachusetts
- Massachusetts Wildlife, by Massachusetts. Division of Fisheries and Game, Massachusetts. Division of Fisheries and Wildlife
- The Flora of Essex County, Massachusetts, by John Robinson
- The Diary of William Bentley D.D., Pastor of the East Church, Salem, by William Bentley, Joseph Gilbert Waters, Marguerite Dalrymple, Alice G. Waters, Essex Institute
- The Physical Geography, Geology, Mineralogy and Paleontology of Essex County
- The Peabody Story: Events in Peabody's History, 1626-1972, by John Andrew Wells
- The New England Historical and Genealogical Register, Volume 56, by Henry Fitz-Gilbert Waters, New England Historic Genealogical Society
- The Fifth Half Century of the Landing of John Endicott at Salem, Massachusetts, by Essex Institute
- Historical Collections of the Essex institute, by Salem Mass, Essex inst
- Rhodora, Volume 4, by Benjamin Lincoln Robinson, Merritt Lyndon Fernald, A book about the plants of the Mineral-Spring Pond area
- The Diary and Letters of Benjamin Pickman (1740–1819) of Salem, Massachusetts, by Benjamin Pickman
- The Lynn Album: A Pictorial History, 1990, by Elizabeth Hope Cushing
- The New England Farmer, Volume 10, by Samuel W. Cole
- Parentator or Remarkables of Dr. Increase Mather, by Cotton Mather, Published 1724
- Bronsdon and Box families, by Lucius Bolles Marsh, Harriet Moncrief Kinmonth Fitts Parker
- Recreation in and about Boston: a handbook of opportunities by Prospect Union Association, Cambridge, Massachusetts
