= George Ropes =

George Ropes Jr. (1788–1819) was an American artist, known for his maritime oil paintings.

The son of a sea captain, and the nephew of a ship owner (Jerathmiel Peirce), in Salem, Massachusetts, George Ropes Jr. was a deaf-mute. He lived in Salem all his life, except for the years 1798–1801, when his father tried his hand at farming (but later went back to sea).

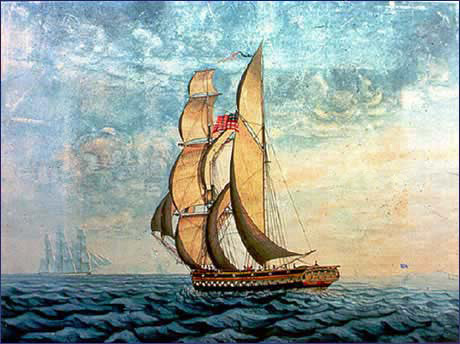
Cleopatra's Barge. This painting is in the collection of the Peabody Essex Museum.

George Jr. received training in painting as a boy from Michele Felice Corne (1752-1845), and demonstrated skill as early as age 14. The diary of William Bentley states, "Mr. George Ropes' dumb (mute) boy is very successful at painting. He is instructed by Corne, an Italian artist in Salem."

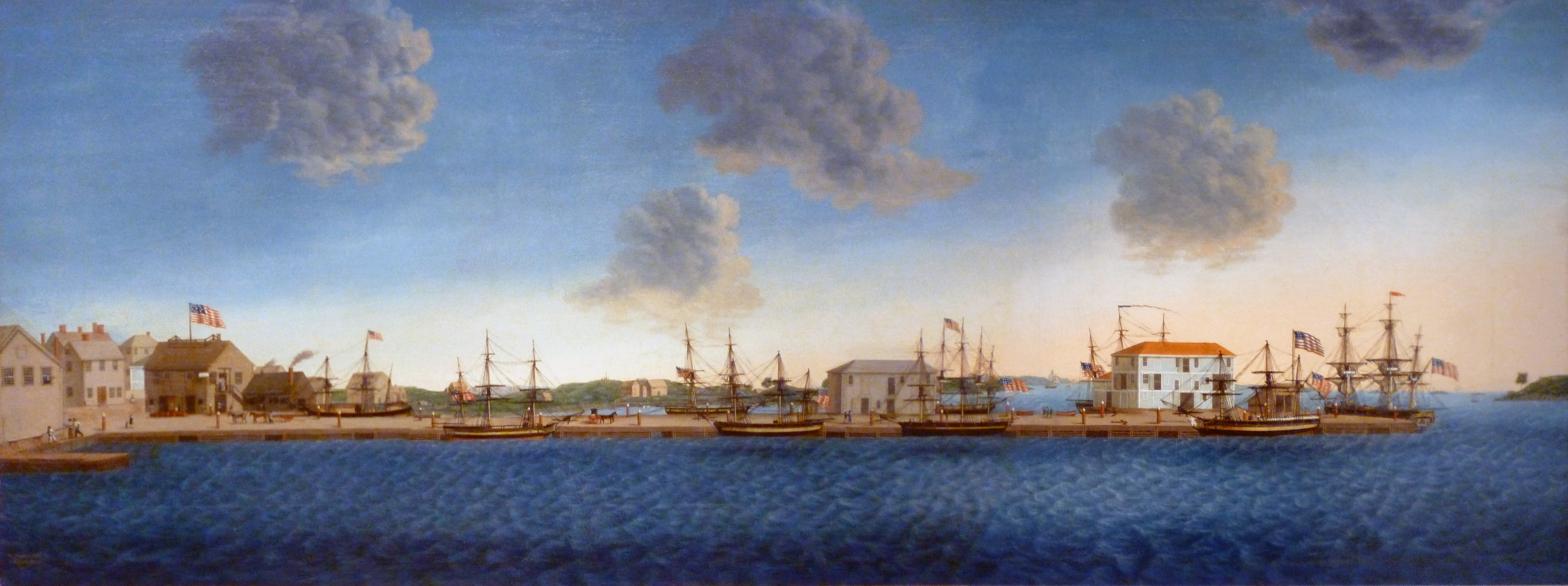
Crowninshield's Wharf, Salem, Massachusetts. This painting is in the collection of the Peabody Essex Museum.

George, Jr's. father died when he was 19 years old, and he turned to painting carriages and signs as a way of supporting his mother and eight siblings. He did not give up painting though, and became one of the prominent artists in the region, painting maritime subjects, landscapes and portraits. His paintings are prized for their accuracy and attention to detail. His career was cut short by consumption, which took his life, at the age of thirty, on 24 January 1819.

One of his paintings is a painting of Mount Vernon, which is in the National Gallery of Art in Washington, D.C. Other examples of his work are in the Smithsonian Institution in Washington, D.C, and the USS Constitution Museum in Charlestown, Boston. Several of his paintings are in the collection of the Peabody Essex Museum in Salem, Massachusetts, including one of the Friendship of Salem. A replica of this sailing ship (built using his painting as a reference) is at the Salem Maritime National Historic Site in Salem.
