= Frederick Bradlee =

American football player (1892–1970)

Frederick Josiah Bradlee Jr.
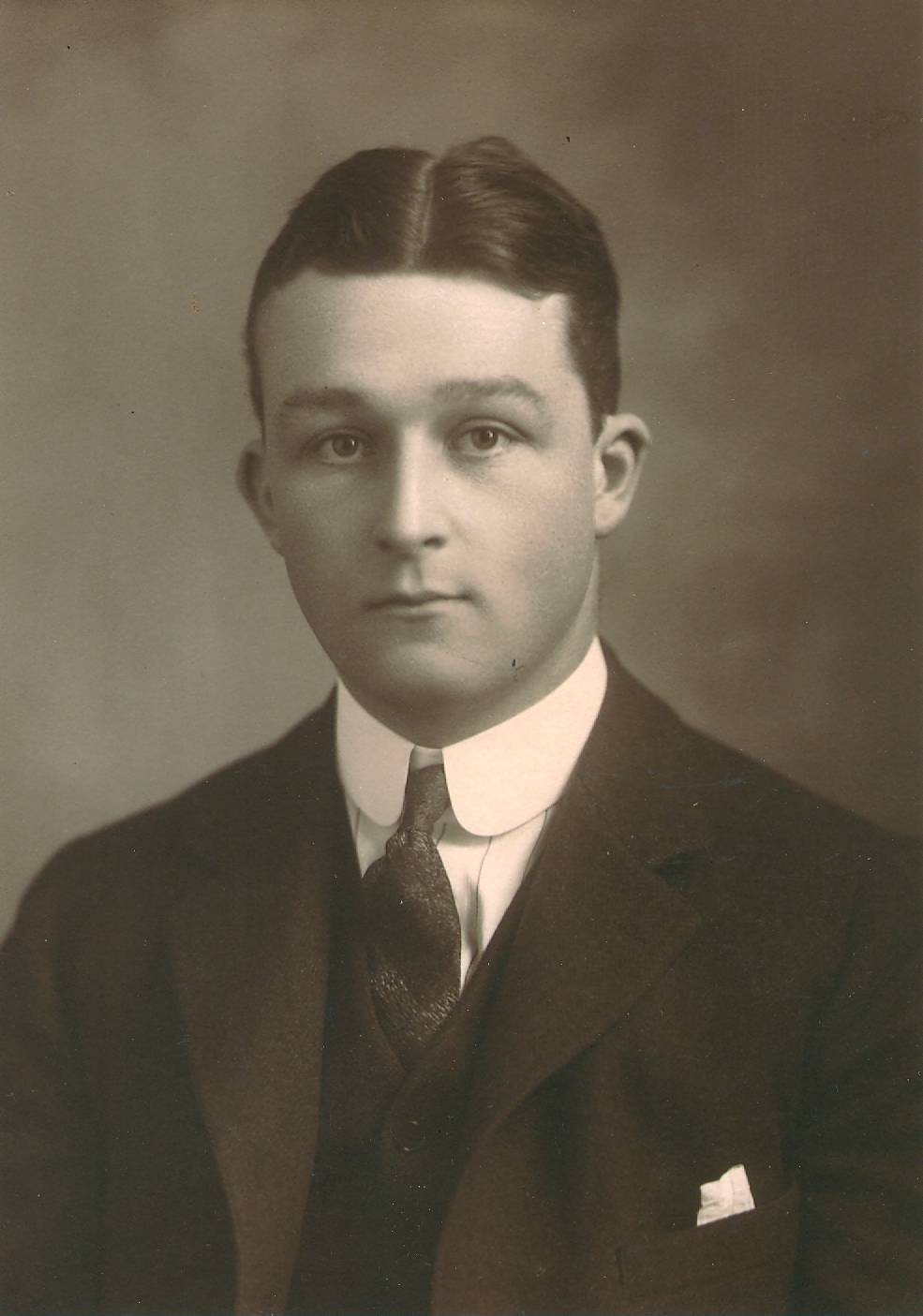

Profile
- Positions: Halfback, Fullback

Personal information
- Born: December 20, 1892; Boston, Massachusetts, U.S.
- Died: April 29, 1970 (aged 77); Beverly, Massachusetts, U.S.

Career information
- College: Harvard University

Frederick Josiah Bradlee Jr. (December 20, 1892 – April 29, 1970) was an American football player. He was a first-team All-American while attending Harvard University in 1914. He was the father of American journalist Ben Bradlee.

== Biography ==
=== Early life ===
Bradlee was born December 20, 1892, on Beacon Street in the Back Bay section of Boston, son of Frederick Josiah Bradlee (1866-1951) and Eliza Whitwell, daughter of Arthur Malcolm Thomas. Frederick's father, Josiah Bradlee (1837-1902), had married Alice, daughter of Francis Boardman Crowninshield (1809-1877), Speaker of the House of the Massachusetts House of Representatives 1848 and 1849, of the "Brahmin" Crowninshield family that had lived in Massachusetts since the 17th century.

=== Harvard University ===
Bradlee enrolled at Harvard University. At Harvard, Bradlee played at the halfback and fullback positions for Percy Haughton's undefeated Harvard Crimson football teams from 1912 to 1914. During Bradlee's three years as a starter for Harvard, he played on teams that included College Football Hall of Famers Huntington Hardwick, Eddie Mahan and Stan Pennock. The Harvard football team did not lose a single game from 1912 to 1914, compiling records of 9–0 in 1912, 9–0 in 1913, and 7–0–2 in 1914. At the end of the 1914 season, Bradlee was selected as a first-team All-American by Collier's Weekly as selected by Walter Camp, the Washington Herald (selected by William Peet), Boston Post (selected by Charles H. Parker), and Tom Thorp in the New York Evening Journal.

=== Later life ===
After graduating from Harvard, Bradlee married Josephine de Gersdorff (1896–1975), the daughter of prominent New York lawyer Carl August de Gersdorff, on July 3, 1917. His wife was his third cousin, sharing great-great-grandfather Benjamin Williams Crowninshield (1772–1851). She was the granddaughter of artist Frederic Crowninshield (1845–1918) and niece of magazine editor Frank Crowninshield (1872–1947).

Bradlee was known while attending college as "Beebo" and simply as "B." He worked as an investment banker with the firm of Bank America Blair Company. His son, Ben Bradlee, wrote of his father's professional experience as follows:

After football, 'B' Bradlee rose quickly like all Brahmin athletes of that era from bank runner, to broker, then vice president of the Boston branch of an investment house called Bank America Blair Company. And then the fall. One day a Golden Boy. Next day, the Depression, and my old man was on the road trying to sell a commercial deodorant and molybdenum mining stock for companies founded and financed by some of his rich pals.

Bradlee worked at odd jobs during the Depression to support his family. Ben Bradlee recalled his father in his autobiography: "My father weighed less than 200 pounds, but he was tough, barrel-chested, strong, fast and soft-spoken. Lying in his arms as a child and listening to that deep voice rolling around in his voice box was all the comfort and reassurance that a child could stand."

Bradlee later served as a financial consultant to the Boston Museum of Fine Arts. His son, Ben Bradlee, became the editor of The Washington Post.

Bradlee suffered an aortic aneurysm and died in April 1970 in Beverly, Massachusetts, at age 77.

== See also ==
- 1914 College Football All-America Team
