= Vanity Fair (American magazine 1913–1936) =

American magazine published 1913–1936

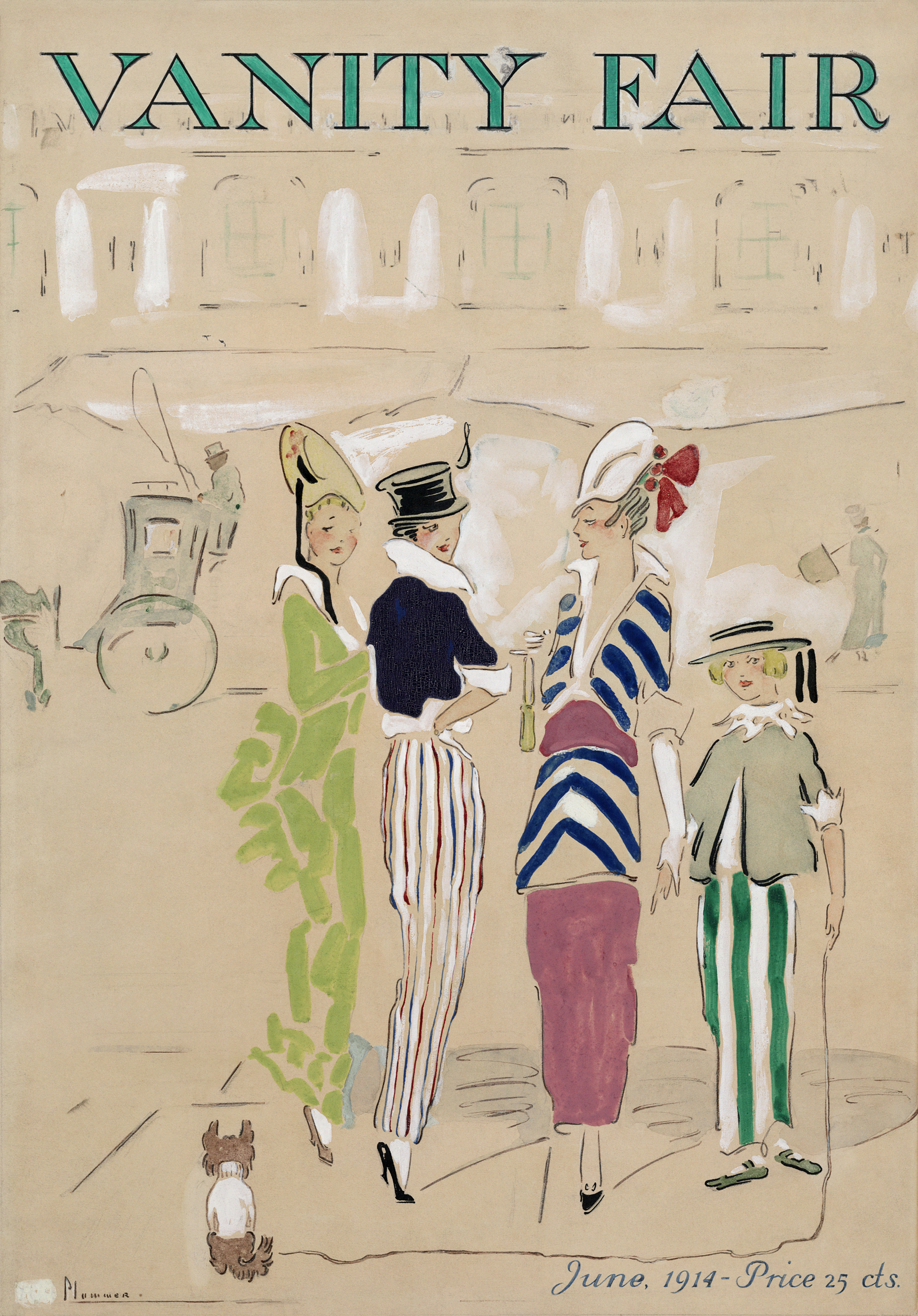
Vanity Fair, cover art for the June 1914 issue. Digitally restored.

Vanity Fair was an American society magazine published from 1913 to 1936. It was highly successful until the Great Depression led to its becoming unprofitable, and it was merged into Vogue in 1936. In the 1980s, the title was revived.

== History ==
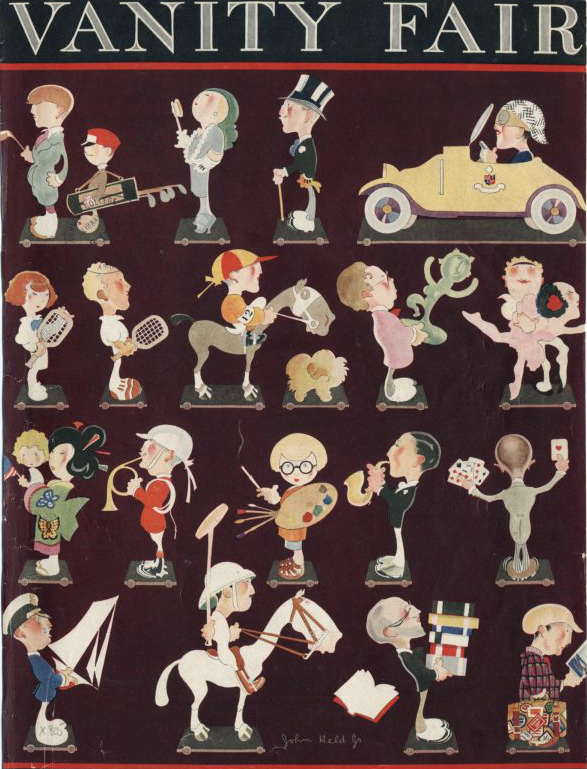
John Held, Jr.'s cover for the April 1921 issue of Vanity Fair

Condé Nast began his empire by purchasing the men's fashion magazine Dress in 1913. He renamed the magazine Dress and Vanity Fair and published four issues in 1913. Nast paid $3,000 for the right to use the title "Vanity Fair" in the United States, granted by the magazine The Standard and Vanity Fair, "the only periodical printed for the playgoer and player", published weekly by the "Standard and Vanity Fair Company, Inc", whose president was Harry Mountford, also General Director of the White Rats theatrical union.

The magazine achieved great popularity under editor Frank Crowninshield. In 1919 Robert Benchley was tapped to become managing editor. He joined Dorothy Parker, who had come to the magazine from Vogue, and was the staff drama critic. Benchley hired future playwright Robert E. Sherwood, who had recently returned from World War I. The trio were among the original members of the Algonquin Round Table, which met at the Algonquin Hotel, on the same West 44th Street block as Condé Nast's offices. Crowninshield attracted some of the best writers of the era. Aldous Huxley, T. S. Eliot, Ferenc Molnár, Gertrude Stein, and Djuna Barnes all appeared in a single issue, July 1923.

In 1915, it published more pages of advertisements than any other US magazine. It continued to thrive into the 1920s.

Starting in 1925, Vanity Fair competed with The New Yorker as the American establishment's top culture chronicle. It contained writing by Thomas Wolfe, T. S. Eliot and P. G. Wodehouse, theatre criticisms by Dorothy Parker, and photographs by Edward Steichen; Clare Boothe Luce was its editor for some time. From the October 1929 issue to the January/February 1943, Vanity Fair was incorporated into Harper's Bazaar in the United Kingdom.

The magazine was a casualty of the Great Depression and declining advertising revenues, although its circulation, at 90,000 copies, was at its peak. Condé Nast announced in December 1935 that Vanity Fair would be merged with Vogue (circulation 156,000) as of the March 1936 issue.

== 1983 revival ==
In 1983 Vanity Fair was revived by Condé Nast Publications as a magazine of pop culture, fashion and politics.
