= Quinn Bradlee =

American filmmaker, author, and advocate

- Born: Josiah Quinn Crowninshield Bradlee; Georgetown, Washington, D.C.
- Education: Landmark College; American University; New York Film Academy
- Spouse: Pary Anbaz-Williamson (m. 2010; div. 2014)
- Parents: Ben Bradlee (father); Sally Quinn (mother)
- Relatives: Frederick Josiah Bradlee, Jr. (grandfather); Lt. Gen. William Wilson Quinn (grandfather); Ben Bradlee Jr. (half-brother); Crowninshield family

Quinn Bradlee is an American filmmaker, author and advocate for improving the lives of disabled individuals. He is the son of the editor Ben Bradlee, and journalist Sally Quinn. He was diagnosed in 1996 with DiGeorge syndrome. He attended The Lab School of Washington, and graduated from the college-preparatory Gow School in 2002. He attended special programs at Landmark College and American University, and studied at the New York Film Academy.

He is the producer of several documentary films including the 2007 film Life with VCFS about the syndrome and the VCFS International Center at Upstate Medical University, and is the associate producer of the 2010 HBO Family documentary film I Can't Do This But I CAN Do That: A Film for Families About Learning Differences. He is the author of the 2009 memoir A Different Life: Growing Up Learning Disabled and Other Adventures, documenting his efforts to overcome VCFS, and, with his father, he co-authored the 2012 book A Life's Work: Fathers and Sons.

He is the webmaster of Friends of Quinn, a website which he created in 2008 as part of the HealthCentral Network for learning disabled individuals. It offers "resources and support for young adults with learning differences." Bradlee is also the youth engagement associate for the National Center for Learning Disabilities.

He married yoga instructor Pary Anbaz-Williamson in 2010, before divorcing in 2014.

Related to his Scottish heritage, he is a FRSA FRAS FSA Scot
