= Martha Raddatz =

American reporter (born 1953)

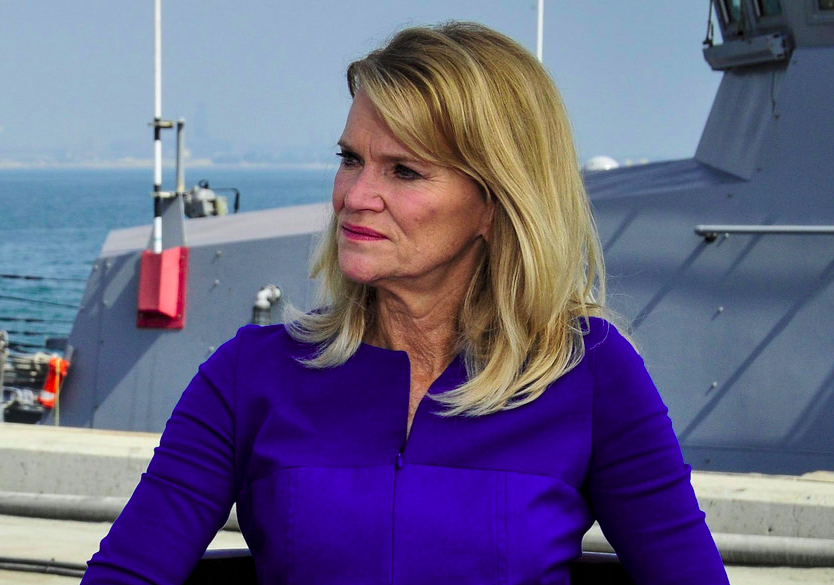
- Raddatz in an interview, 2014
- Born: February 14, 1953 (age 73); Idaho Falls, Idaho, U.S.
- Education: University of Utah (attended)
- Occupation: Chief Global Affairs Correspondent
- Years active: 1999–present
- Employer: ABC News
- Spouses: Ben Bradlee Jr. (m. 1979–1991) Julius Genachowski (m. 1991; div. 1997) Tom Gjelten (m. 1997)
- Children: 2

Martha Raddatz (/ˈrædɪts/; born February 14, 1953) is an American journalist with ABC News. She is the network's chief global affairs correspondent reporting for ABC's World News Tonight, Nightline, and serves as co-anchor for Sunday-morning program political affairs program, This Week since 2016.

In addition to her work for ABC News, Raddatz has written for The New Republic and is a frequent guest on PBS's Washington Week.

== Early life ==
Raddatz was born in Idaho Falls, Idaho, to Edward Dustin Raddatz and Doris Elaine (née Anderson). Her family later moved to Salt Lake City. She attended the University of Utah but dropped out to work at a local station.

== Career ==
=== Early career ===
Prior to 1993, Raddatz was the chief correspondent at the ABC News Boston affiliate WCVB-TV. From 1993 to 1998, Raddatz covered the Pentagon for National Public Radio.

=== ABC News ===
Raddatz began her tenure at ABC News in 1999 as the network's state department correspondent and became ABC's senior national security correspondent in May 2003, reporting extensively from Iraq. On June 8, 2006, Raddatz received a tip that terrorist Abu Musab al-Zarqawi had been located and killed. This tip allowed Raddatz and ABC News to become the first news organization in the world to break the news shortly after 2:30 a.m. EST. In May 2007, she reported from Ramallah.

In a March 24, 2008, extended interview with Dick Cheney conducted in Ankara, Turkey, on the fifth anniversary of the 2003 invasion of Iraq, Raddatz posed a question about public opinion polls showing that Americans had lost confidence in the war, a question to which Cheney responded by saying "So?" Raddatz appeared taken aback by the response, and Cheney's remark prompted widespread criticism, including a Washington Post op-ed by former Republican congressman and Cheney friend, Mickey Edwards. Leading up to the interview with Cheney, four thousand United States Armed Forces personnel had died.

After the national security beat, Raddatz became the network's chief White House correspondent for the last term of the George W. Bush administration. On January 9, 2007, Raddatz's mobile phone went off during a White House press briefing with Tony Snow. Of particular humor was her musical ring tone, Chamillionaire's "Ridin'." The press corps and Tony Snow enjoyed a few moments of laughter.

In 2008 while reporting in Iraq, Shameem Rassam and Raddatz gave information on Iraqi life to Barbara Delinsky.

Raddatz was appointed as ABC's senior foreign affairs correspondent in November 2008.

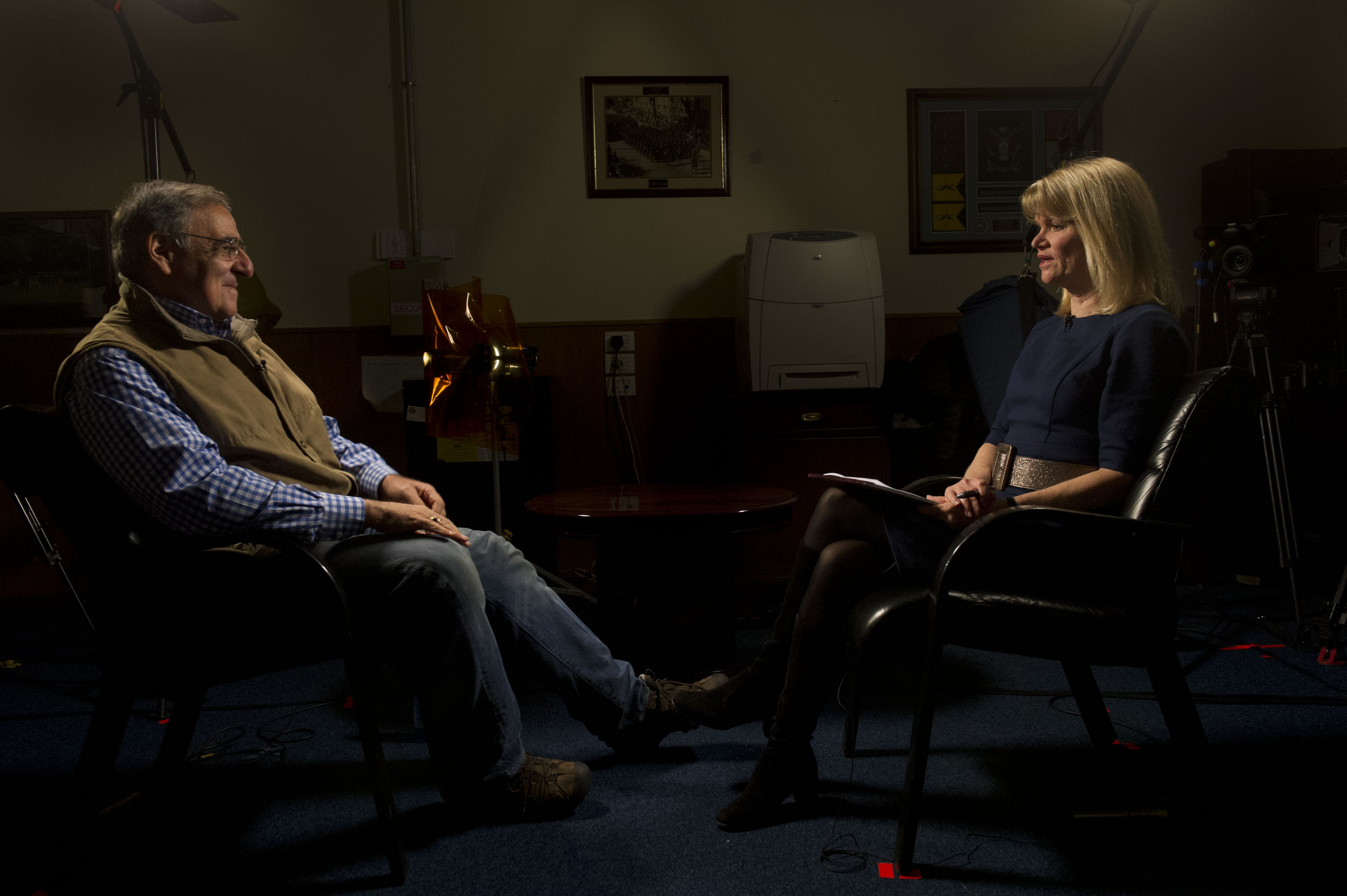
Raddatz interviewing U.S. Defense Secretary Leon Panetta in January 2013

Raddatz served as the moderator of the vice-presidential debate on October 11, 2012 between Paul Ryan and Joe Biden at Centre College in Danville, Kentucky. Raddatz also served alongside Anderson Cooper as co-moderator for the second presidential debate in 2016, between Hillary Clinton and Donald Trump at Washington University in St. Louis. Cooper and Raddatz were reviewed and some commentators noted their "no-nonsense approach" and "aggressive style", though Raddatz was criticized for a challenge to one of Trump's statements, which some journalists felt "fell outside of her mandate as moderator".

The Guardian said in 2014 that Raddatz "is known for having well-cultivated sources inside the Defense Department."

In February 2014, ABC News announced Raddatz would become substitute anchor for This Week with George Stephanopoulos. In January 2016, ABC News announced she would become co-anchor of the program.

In 2024 while reporting from Ukraine, Raddatz gave insight and wisdom to her younger colleagues reporting in the country.

=== In popular culture ===
Raddatz appeared as a reporter interviewing the President-elect of the United States in the 2017 episode "Imminent Risk" of the Showtime series Homeland.

== Bibliography ==
Raddatz has written two books. The first is a book was a New York Times Best Seller about the siege of Sadr City, Iraq which has been adapted into a TV mini series which aired on National Geographic in late 2017. In 2026, she published another book related to her experiences with being a war correspondent.

- The Long Road Home: A Story of War and Family. New York: G.P. Putnam's Sons. 2007. ISBN 978-0-399-15382-2. LCCN 2006037332. OCLC 76261936.
- The Hero Next Door: Stories of Patriotism and Purpose (Hardcover). New York: Avid Reader Press. 2026. ISBN 9781668093801. LCCN 2025951010. OCLC 1550221168.

== Personal life ==
Raddatz resides in Arlington, Virginia, with her third husband, journalist Tom Gjelten. She has two children from two previous marriages: a daughter, Greta Bradlee, and a son, Jake Genachowski. Her first husband was Ben Bradlee Jr., a Pulitzer Prize-winning editor for The Boston Globe, biographer, and son of former Washington Post executive editor Benjamin C. Bradlee. Her second husband was Julius Genachowski, chairman of the U.S. Federal Communications Commission under the Obama administration. President Barack Obama attended their wedding in 1991, when he and Genachowski were students at Harvard Law School.

Media offices
Preceded by Terry Moran	Chief White House Correspondent of ABC News; 2006–2008	Succeeded by Jake Tapper
