= Ben Bradlee Jr. =

American journalist & writer (born 1948)

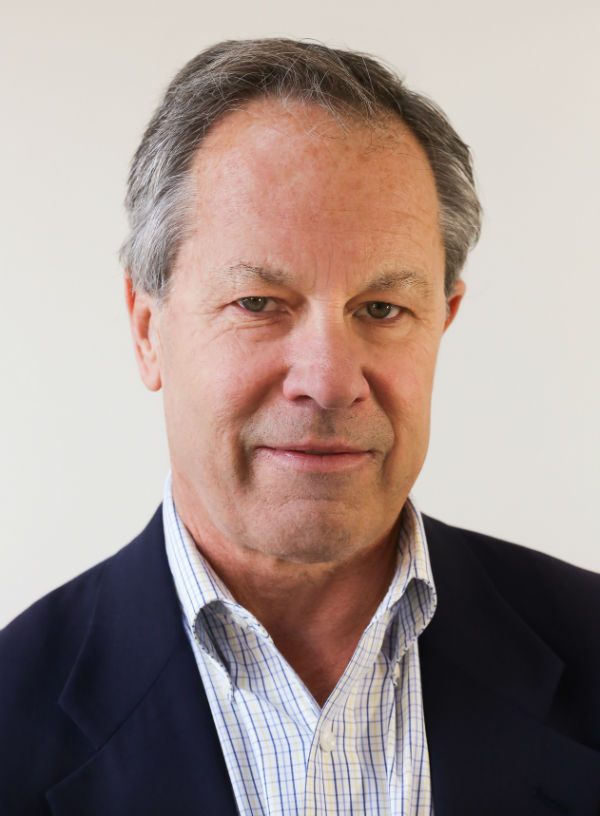
- Bradlee in 2012
- Born: Benjamin Crowninshield Bradlee Jr. August 7, 1948 (age 78); Manchester, New Hampshire, U.S.
- Education: Colby College
- Occupations: Journalist, author
- Spouses: Cathie Smith (m. 1970–1980) Martha Raddatz (m. 1980; div. 1990) Janice Saragoni (m. 1990; div. 2015) Cynthia Hickman (m. 2018)
- Children: 3
- Parent: Ben Bradlee (father)
- Relatives: Crowninshield family
- Awards: Pulitzer Prize for Public Service

Benjamin Crowninshield Bradlee Jr. (born August 7, 1948) is an American journalist and writer. He was a reporter and editor at The Boston Globe for 25 years, including a period when he supervised the Pulitzer Prize–winning investigation into sexual abuse by priests in the Boston archdiocese, and is the author of a comprehensive biography of Ted Williams. His book, The Forgotten: How the People of One Pennsylvania County Elected Donald Trump and Changed America, about Luzerne County, Pennsylvania, and the 2016 United States presidential election was released on October 2, 2018.

== Life and career ==
Bradlee was born in Manchester, New Hampshire, to Ben Bradlee Sr (1921–2014), the future editor of The Washington Post, and his first wife Jean Saltonstall (1921–2011). His parents, who both came from Boston Brahmin families, divorced when he was seven. After spending five years in Paris, from the ages of two to seven while his father worked for Newsweek, Bradlee grew up in Cambridge, Massachusetts. As a teenager, he was given a taste of journalism as a copy boy at The Boston Globe. He graduated from Colby College and then served in the Peace Corps in Afghanistan from 1970 to 1972.

Bradlee worked for several years at the Riverside Press-Enterprise in California but then spent most of his career at The Boston Globe, where he was successively State House reporter, investigative reporter, national correspondent, political editor, and metropolitan editor. In 1993, he was promoted to assistant managing editor responsible for investigations and projects. He was then deputy managing editor during the time he edited the Globe's reporting of the Roman Catholic Archdiocese of Boston's repeated cover-ups of sexual abuse of children by priests, a painstaking investigation that began in 2001 and continued for two years. The paper's investigation was awarded the 2003 Pulitzer Prize for Public Service. In the 2015 film Spotlight, which dramatizes that investigation, Bradlee is portrayed by John Slattery. Bradlee made a cameo appearance as a journalist with a notepad during and after the scene depicting the Archbishop Bernard Law's response on television to the 9/11 attacks.

He left the Globe in 2004 to work on a biography of Boston Red Sox icon Ted Williams, which ultimately took ten years of in-depth research to finish. The Kid: The Immortal Life of Ted Williams was released in 2013. It received favorable reviews, highlighting the author's research into Williams' concealed Mexican–American identity and troubled family relationships (which culminated in the disputed cryonic preservation of Williams' head and torso). The book, which was a New York Times best-seller, has been optioned for a TV miniseries.

Bradlee's first book The Ambush Murders, an account of the brutal killings of two California policemen, was the basis for a television movie which aired on CBS in 1982. A later book on Oliver North and the Iran–Contra affair was made into a miniseries by CBS in 1989.

In 2016, Bradlee was appointed by Boston Mayor Marty Walsh to the Boston Public Library's Board of Trustees.

== Personal life ==
Bradlee has been married four times: to Cathie Smith (1970–1980), to broadcast journalist Martha Raddatz, to Janice Saragoni for 25 years, ending in 2015, and to Cynthia Hickman since February 2018. He has three children.

== In popular culture ==
Bradlee was portrayed by actor John Slattery in Spotlight, a 2015 historical drama about Boston's Catholic Church sex abuse scandals. Spotlight won the Academy Award for Best Picture at the 88th Academy Awards in February 2016. Bradlee himself has a brief cameo as an anonymous reporter in the Globe newsroom, writing on a reporter's pad while the Globe team watches the coverage of 9/11.

== Books ==
- The Forgotten: How the People of One Pennsylvania County Elected Donald Trump and Changed America, Little, Brown and Company, 2018, ISBN 978-0-316-51573-3
- The Kid: The Immortal Life of Ted Williams, Little, Brown and Company, 2013, ISBN 978-0-316-61435-1
- Betrayal: The Crisis in the Catholic Church, The Investigative Staff of The Boston Globe (Editor), Little, Brown and Company, 2002, ISBN 978-0-316-07558-9
- Guts and Glory: The Rise and Fall of Oliver North, Donald I. Fine, 1988, ISBN 978-1-556-11053-5
- Prophet of Blood: The Untold Story of Ervil Lebaron and the Lambs of God, with Dale Van Atta, Putnam Publishing Group, 1981, ISBN 978-0-399-12371-9
- The Ambush Murders: The True Account of the Killing of Two California Policemen, Dodd, Mead, 1979, ISBN 978-0-396-07624-7
