= Capt. George Lovell House =

Historic house in Massachusetts, United States

- U.S. National Register of Historic Places
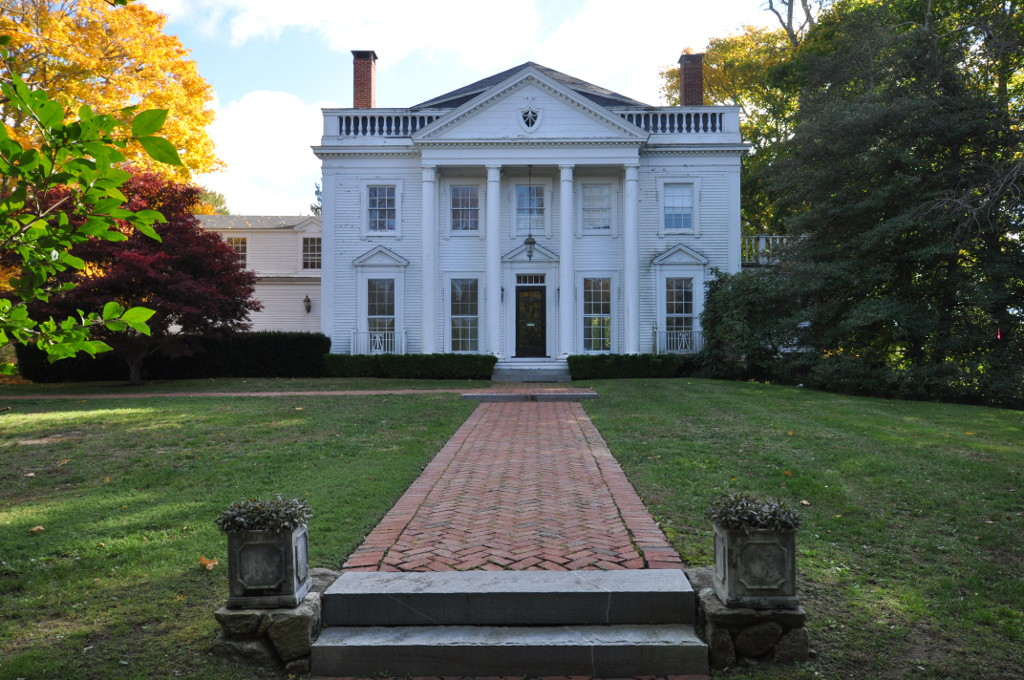

- Location within Cape Cod Location within Massachusetts Location within the United States
- Location: 8 E. Bay Rd., Barnstable, Massachusetts
- Coordinates: 41°37′40″N 70°22′46″W
- Area: 2.74 acres (1.11 ha)
- Built: 1826
- Architectural style: Colonial Revival
- MPS: Barnstable MRA
- NRHP reference No.: 87000290
- Added to NRHP: November 10, 1987

The Capt. George Lovell House is a historic house located in the Osterville section of Barnstable, Massachusetts.

== Description and history ==
It is a 2 1/2-story wood-frame house, five bays wide, with a hip roof, paired chimneys at the sides, and a hip roof. It was built in 1826, and was the home of a prominent local ship's captain. In 1925-26 the house received a major upgrade, which included the addition of the Greek four-column temple portico front, and other Colonial Revival styling.

The house was listed on the National Register of Historic Places on November 10, 1987.

== See also ==
- National Register of Historic Places listings in Barnstable County, Massachusetts
