= Wianno Historic District =

Historic district in Massachusetts, United States

- U.S. National Register of Historic Places
- U.S. Historic district
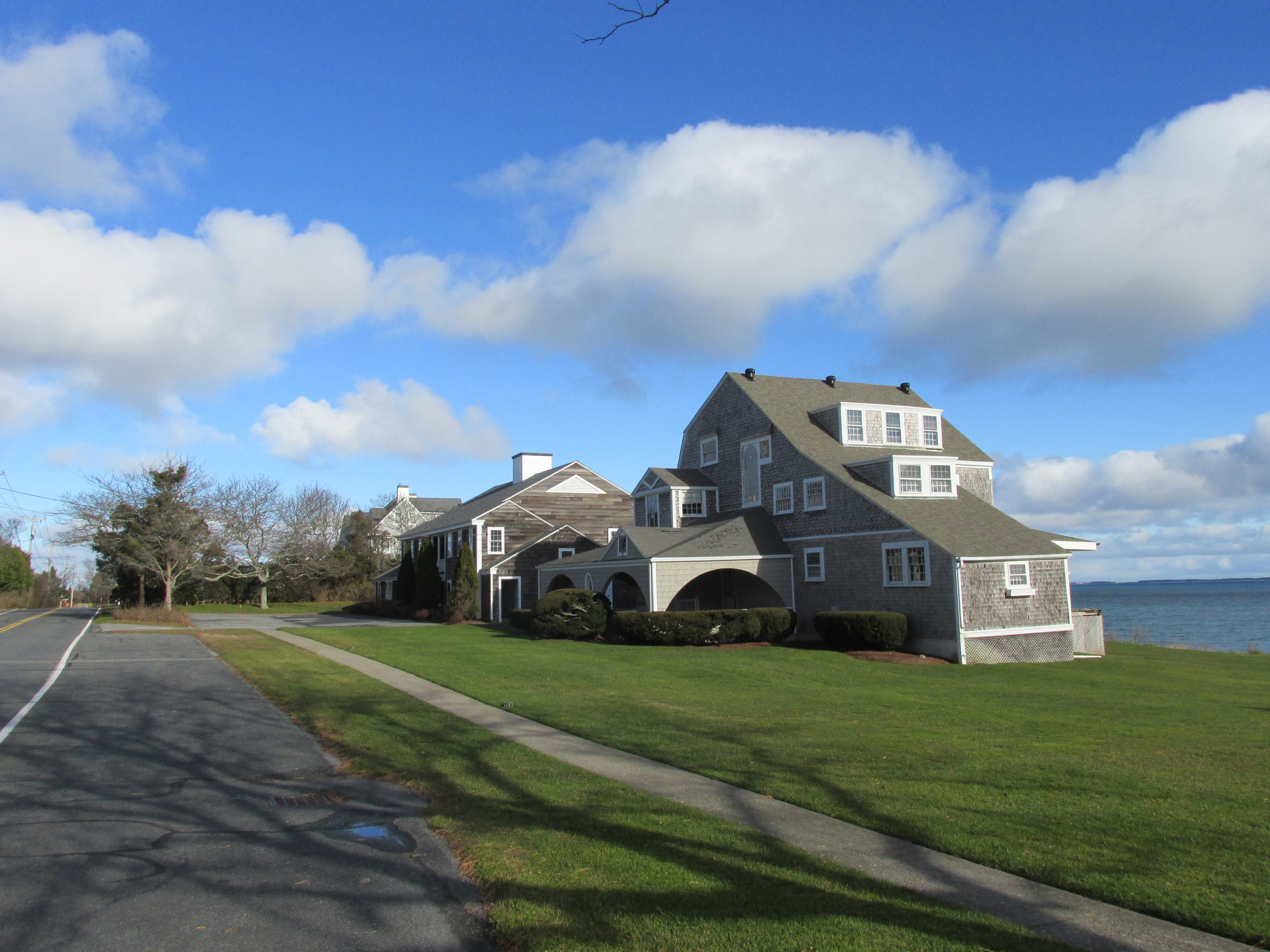
- Along Sea View Avenue

- Location within Cape Cod Location within Massachusetts Location within the United States
- Location: Barnstable, Massachusetts
- Coordinates: 41°37′3″N 70°22′24″W
- Area: 40 acres (16 ha)
- Built: 1879
- Architect: Frazer, Horace; et al.
- Architectural style: Colonial Revival, Shingle Style
- MPS: Barnstable MRA
- NRHP reference No.: 87000316
- Added to NRHP: November 10, 1987

The Wianno Historic District is a historic district in the Osterville section of Barnstable, Massachusetts. It encompasses a well-preserved summer resort area for the wealthy that was first developed in the late 19th century, focused around the Wianno Club, built in 1881 on the site of an earlier resort hotel. The 40-acre (16 ha) district has a significant number of well-preserved Shingle style and Colonial Revival houses. Architect Horace Frazer designed the Wianno Club, as well as a number of the private residences in the district. The district is roughly bounded by East Bay Road, Wianno and Sea View Avenues between Nantucket Sound and Crystal Lake. It was added to the National Register of Historic Places in 1987.

== Description and history ==
The Wianno area occupies a small portion of the southern coast of Cape Cod in the Osterville section of Barnstable. It includes a series of waterfront properties on Sea View Avenue extending from Warren Street to Wianno Avenue, and extends a short way along Wianno, including a few properties lacking direct access to the water. The central focus of the district is the Wianno Club, a large Shingle/Colonial Revival structure designed by Horace Frazer and built in 1881 to replace the grand c. 1873 Cotocheset House hotel, which had burned down. The colony had been planned in the 1870s by wealthy interests from Boston, New York City, and the local area, which had bought up most of the land on a speculative basis, built the hotel, and sold of parcels for summer houses. The result was a series of handsome "cottages", large two-story wood-frame structures that are predominantly Shingle style. These houses are typically somewhat rambling in character, often with gambrel roofs, and with porches, projecting gables, and dormers to give visual interest. They are set on larger lots (typically 1 acre (0.40 ha) or more).

One particularly handsome example of the houses built is the Calvin Prescott House, 550 Wianno Avenue, which was built in 1882-83. It is 2-1/2 stories in height, with a gabled roof pierced by eyebrow windows, corner turret and complex entry pavilion. The Isobel Richards House, 432 Wianno, has Queen Anne features, and has a windmill on the property, one of several found in the district. The Tiffany House, located next to the Wianno Club and now one of its guest houses, was built for a member of Louis Comfort Tiffany's family in 1879.

== See also ==
- National Register of Historic Places listings in Barnstable County, Massachusetts
