= List of shipwrecks in September 1844 =

The list of shipwrecks in September 1844 includes ships sunk, foundered, wrecked, grounded, or otherwise lost during September 1844.

== 1 September ==
List of shipwrecks: 1 September 1844
Ship	State	Description
Arab	United Kingdom	The paddle steamer was driven ashore at Seaton, County Durham. Her passengers were taken off by the steam tug Netherton (United Kingdom). Arab was on a voyage from Leith, Lothian to Newcastle upon Tyne, Northumberland.
Lady Grey	United Kingdom	The ship was wrecked on Alert's Reef with the loss of one life. Survivors were rescued the next day by HMS Fly (Royal Navy). She was on a voyage from Sydney, New South Wales to Batavia, Netherlands East Indies.

== 2 September ==
List of shipwrecks: 2 September 1844
Ship	State	Description
Amelia	France	The ship was driven ashore on "Horsden Island". She was on a voyage from Boulogne, Pas-de-Calais to Narva, Russia. She was refloated on 6 September and resumed her voyage.
John and Mary	United Kingdom	The ship ran aground off Skagen, Denmark. She was on a voyage from Newcastle upon Tyne, Northumberland to Saint Petersburg, Russia. She was refloated and put in to "Skulatmus", Sweden in a leaky condition.
Lord Oriel	United Kingdom	The ship was sighted off Penarth, Glamorgan whilst on a voyage from Newport, Monmouthshire to Jersey, Channel Islands. No further trace, presumed foundered with the loss of all hands.
Pomona	United Kingdom	The ship sprang a leak and sank off Kiy Island, Russia.

== 3 September ==
List of shipwrecks: 3 September 1844
Ship	State	Description
Achilles	United Kingdom	The ship ran aground on the Cant. She was on a voyage from London to Portsmouth, Hampshire. She was refloated and taken in to Sheerness, Kent in a leaky condition.
Alpha	United Kingdom	The ship ran aground on the Spaniard Sand. She was refloated.
Andradus	United States	The ship departed from La Rochelle, Charente-Maritime, France for New York. No further trace, presumed foundered with the loss of all hands.
Friends of Liberty	United Kingdom	The ship ran aground on the Middle Sand. She was refloated.
Gute Hoffnung	Hamburg	The ship ran aground on the Movellsand. She was on a voyage from Hamburg to Bremen. She was refloated and taken in to Cuxhaven in a leaky condition.
Holyhead Trader	United Kingdom	The ship was driven ashore at St. Margaret's Hope, Orkney Islands.
Magnet	(United Kingdom of Great Britain and Ireland) New Zealand	The whaler, a barque, was driven onto a rocky shore and wrecked at Peraki whaling station, 30 kilometres (19 mi) from Akaroa, New Zealand, with the loss of a crew member. The same location had seen the wreck of the Speculator and Transfer during a storm three years earlier.
Margaret	United Kingdom	The schooner ran aground on the Middle Sand. She was on a voyage from London to Bristol, Gloucestershire. She was refloated and resumed her voyage.
Sarah	(United Kingdom of Great Britain and Ireland) Isle of Man	The schooner was driven ashore at Freswick, Caithness. She was on a voyage from Liverpool, Lancashire to Berwick upon Tweed, Northumberland. She was refloated and resumed her voyage.
Thomas and Mary	United Kingdom	The ship ran aground on the Gunfleet Sand, in the North Sea off the coast of Essex. She was on a voyage from King's Lynn, Norfolk to London. She was refloated and taken in to Wivenhoe, Essex.

== 4 September ==
List of shipwrecks: 4 September 1844
Ship	State	Description
Alliance	United Kingdom	The schooner was driven ashore and wrecked near Wick, Caithness. Her crew were rescued. She was on a voyage from Peterhead, Aberdeenshire to Wick.
Christiana	United Kingdom	The ship ran aground on Lady Isle, in the Firth of Clyde. She was on a voyage from the Clyde to Demerara, British Guiana. She was refloated and put back to the Clyde.
Glensmore	United Kingdom	The ship was driven ashore and wrecked on Stronsay, Orkney Islands. She was on a voyage from the Clyde to Quebec City, Province of Canada, British North America.
Maria Johanna	Norway	The schooner ran aground betweenStaxigoe and Noss Head, Caithness. She was on a voyage from Kragerø to Wick. She was refloated and taken in to Staxigoe.
Sovereign	United Kingdom	The ship ran aground north of Peterhead, Aberdeenshire. She was on a voyage from the Shetland Islands to Aberdeen. She was refloated and resumed her voyage.
St. Vincent	United Kingdom	The ship was driven ashore at "Bogney Point", Scotland. She was on a voyage from Glasgow, Renfrewshire to Demerara, British Honduras. She was refloated on 6 September and put in to Greenock, Renfrewshire.

== 5 September ==
List of shipwrecks: 5 September 1844
Ship	State	Description
Bear	United Kingdom	The ship ran aground off Campbeltown, Argyllshire and was damaged. She was on a voyage from Oban, Argyllshire to the Isle of Arran.
Luna	United Kingdom	The ship foundered in the North Sea. Her crew were rescued by Garronnes (United Kingdom).
New Milford	United Kingdom	The smack was wrecked near Pwllheli, Caernarfonshire. Her four crew were rescued.
Princess Royal	United Kingdom	The ship ran aground on the Seal Rock, off the coast of County Sligo and was damaged. She was on a voyage from Cardiff, Glamorgan to Sligo. She was refloated on 6 September.

== 6 September ==
List of shipwrecks: 6 September 1844
Ship	State	Description
Pomona	United Kingdom	The ship sprang a leak and was beached between The Manacles and Black Head, Cornwall where she became a wreck. She was on a voyage from Calstock, Cornwall to Swansea, Glamorgan.
Wanderer	United Kingdom	The ship was driven ashore at Speton Cliff, in Filey Bay. Her crew were rescued. She was on a voyage from South Shields, County Durham to Constantinople, Ottoman Empire. She was later refloated and towed in to South Shields.

== 7 September ==
List of shipwrecks: 7 September 1844
Ship	State	Description
Astrea	Norway	The ship was driven ashore on Gotland, Sweden. She was on a voyage from a Cornish port to Sundsvall. She was refloated and resumed her voyage.
Belle	United Kingdom	The ship ran aground on the Mickery. She was on a voyage from Charleston, South Carolina, United States to Malmö, Sweden.
Ceylon	United Kingdom	The barque was wrecked on Camden Point, County Cork. She was on a voyage from Belfast, County Antrim to Saint John, New Brunswick, British North America. She was driven higher up the beach on 9 October.
Grephia, or Sarepta	Danzig	The ship ran aground near Halmstad, Sweden. She was on a voyage from Danzig to London, United Kingdom. She was refloated and put in to Gothenburg, Sweden for repairs.
Preussische Adler	Greifswald	The ship sprang a leak and sank off "Egerven". Her crew were rescued. She was on a voyage from Königsberg, Prussia to Leith, Lothian, United Kingdom.

== 8 September ==
List of shipwrecks: 8 September 1844
Ship	State	Description
Bellona	United Kingdom	The ship foundered in the Atlantic Ocean. Her crew were rescued by Nicholson (United Kingdom). Bellona was on a voyage from Bideford, Devon to Quebec City, Province of Canada, British North America.
Le Clémentine	French Navy	The schooner was wrecked at "Tarravao", Tahiti.

== 9 September ==
List of shipwrecks: 9 September 1844
Ship	State	Description
Star	United Kingdom	The ship was driven ashore south of Angra Peguena, Portuguese West Africa. Her crew were rescued. She was subsequently destroyed by fire.

== 10 September ==
List of shipwrecks: 10 September 1844
Ship	State	Description
Dolbadarn Castle	United Kingdom	The schooner collided with Londonderry (United Kingdom) and foundered off the Toward Lighthouse, Argyllshire. Her crew were rescued. She was on a voyage from Caernarvon to Glasgow, Renfrewshire.
Mary	United Kingdom	The ship ran aground on Craignish Point, Argyllshire. She was on a voyage from Liverpool, Lancashire to Dundee, Forfarshire. She was refloated and put in to Oban, Argyllshire for repairs.
Parana	United Kingdom	The brig was run down and sunk off Puffin Island, Anglesey by Iron Duke (United Kingdom) with the loss of six of her eleven crew. She was on a voyage from Liverpool, Lancashire to Montreal, Province of Canada, British North America.

== 11 September ==
List of shipwrecks: 11 September 1844
Ship	State	Description
Thule	United States	The whaler was wrecked on a shoal in the Pacific Ocean (21°00′S 138°37′E). Her 24 crew survived.

== 12 September ==
List of shipwrecks: 12 September 1844
Ship	State	Description
Innisfail	United Kingdom	The steamship ran aground on the Gunfleet Sand, in the North Sea off the coast of Essex. She was on a voyage from Newcastle upon Tyne, Northumberland to London. She was refloated on 14 September and resumed her voyage.
Joshua Carroll	United Kingdom	The ship ran aground off the coast of Denmark. She was on a voyage from Alloa, Clackmannanshire to Saint Petersburg, Russia.
Nancy	United States	The ship was driven ashore at Cape Henry, Virginia. She was on a voyage from Jamaica to Alexandria, Virginia.
Peg	United Kingdom	The ship was wrecked at Barbados.
Prospect	United Kingdom	The ship ran aground off the coast of Denmark. She was on a voyage from Stettin to London. She was refloated and put in to Helsingør for repairs.

== 13 September ==
List of shipwrecks: 13 September 1844
Ship	State	Description
Argo	United Kingdom	The ship was wrecked on Skagen, Denmark. Her crew were rescued. She was on a voyage from St. David's, Pembrokeshire to Riga, Russia.
Bussorah Merchant	United Kingdom	The ship ran aground on the Goodwin Sands, Kent. She was on a voyage from Bombay, India to London. She was refloated and resumed her voyage.
Dart	United Kingdom	The ship was driven ashore at Beachy Head, Sussex. She was on a voyage from Dartmouth, Devon to London. She was refloated and resumed her voyage.
Maria	United Kingdom	The ship foundered off Burry, Glamorgan, Her crew were rescued. She was on a voyage from Hayle, Cornwall to Barry, Glamorgan.
Rival	Hamburg	The ship was driven ashore at Portland, Maine, United States. She was on a voyage from Havana, Cuba to Hamburg. She was refloated the next day and taken in to Portland for repairs.

== 14 September ==
List of shipwrecks: 14 September 1844
Ship	State	Description
Ellen Gillman	United Kingdom	The ship ran aground off Aigio, Greece. She was refloated and put in to Patras, Greece.
Jeans	United Kingdom	The ship was driven ashore in Carnarvon Bay. She was on a voyage from Bideford, Devon to Liverpool, Lancashire.
Susan and Ann	United Kingdom	The ship was driven ashore near Wick, Caithness. She was refloated. She was refloated.
Tyro	United Kingdom	The smack ran aground on the Shipwash Sand, in the North Sea off the coast of Essex. She was on a voyage from Port Madoc, Caernarfonshire to Ipswich, Suffolk. She floated off but consequently sank. Her crew were rescued.

== 15 September ==
List of shipwrecks: 15 September 1844
Ship	State	Description
Stamper	United Kingdom	The ship ran aground in Mordant Bay and was damaged. She was subsequently abandoned by all but two of her crew. Stamper was on a voyage from Saint John, New Brunswick, British North America to Ulverstone, Lancashire. She was towed in to Fleetwood, Lancashire on 17 September.
Visitor	United Kingdom	The ship departed from Halifax, Nova Scotia, British North America for Jamaica. No further trace, presumed foundered with the loss of all hands.

== 16 September ==
List of shipwrecks: 16 September 1844
Ship	State	Description
Gazelle	United Kingdom	The ship was wrecked at Keel Head, Cape Breton Island, Nova Scotia, British North America. She was on a voyage from Miramichi, New Brunswick to a port in Newfoundland.
Njord	Russia	The ship was wrecked on Malta. She was on a voyage from Narva to Amsterdam, North Holland, Netherlands.
Prince Albert	United Kingdom	The brig was wrecked on the north coast of Fogo, Cape Verde Islands. Her crew survived.
Star	United Kingdom	The ship was wrecked at Angra Pequena, Portuguese West Africa. Her crew were rescued.
Thetis	United Kingdom	The ship ran aground on the Herd Sand, in the North Sea off the coast of County Durham. She was refloated.
Tyro	United Kingdom	The smack ran aground on the Shipwash Sand, in the North Sea off the coast of Essex. Her crew were rescued. She was on a voyage from Port Madoc, Caernarfonshire to Ipswich, Suffolk. She was refloated but subsequently sank.
Zebra	(United Kingdom of Great Britain and Ireland) Isle of Man	The schooner was driven ashore and damaged at Ringkøbing, Denmark. Her crew were rescued. She was on a voyage from Cardiff, Glamorgan to Stettin. Zebra was refloated on 27 September.

== 17 September ==
List of shipwrecks: 17 September 1844
Ship	State	Description
Aline	Hamburg	The ship ran aground and was wrecked on Eierland, North Holland, Netherlands. Her crew were rescued. She was on a voyage from Bahia, Brazil to Hamburg.
Amphitrite	United Kingdom	The ship struck the Sheringham Shoal, in the North Sea off the coast of Norfolk. She was consequently beached at Bacton, Norfolk. Amphitrite was on a voyage from North Shields, County Durham to London. She was subsequently refloated and taken in to Great Yarmouth, Norfolk
Lady Scott	United Kingdom	The full-rigged ship was abandoned in the Gulf of Finland. Her crew were rescued by the schooner La Dorade (France). She was on a voyage from Liverpool, Lancashire to Saint Petersburg, Russia. Lady Scott was wrecked on Nickman's Grounds, in the Baltic Sea on 26 October.
Lively	United Kingdom	The ship was driven ashore at Staithes, Yorkshire.
Maria Augusta	Stettin	The ship ran aground on Bornholm, Denmark. She was on a voyage from Stettin to Riga, Russia. She was refloated and put in to Rønne, Denmark.
Nine	United Kingdom	The brig was wrecked on the Hartwell Reef, off the Cape Verde Islands. Her crew survived.

== 18 September ==
List of shipwrecks: 18 September 1844
Ship	State	Description
Active	Norway	The ship was wrecked on a reef north west of Læsø, Denmark. Her crew were rescued. She was on a voyage from [[Østerrisør]] to Fredrikshavn, Denmark.
Vine	United Kingdom	The ship was wrecked on the Haisborough Sands, in the North Sea off the coast of Norfolk. Her crew were rescued. She was on a voyage from South Shields, County Durham to Rouen, Seine-Inférieure, France.

== 19 September ==
List of shipwrecks: 19 September 1844
Ship	State	Description
Paul et Virginie	France	The ship foundered off Ouessant, Finistère. Her crew were rescued. She was on a voyage from Newcastle upon Tyne, Northumberland, United Kingdom to Brest, Finistère.
Prince of Orange	United Kingdom	The ship was driven ashore at Rethoville, Manche. She was on a voyage from Newcastle upon Tyne to Cherbourg, Seine-Inférieure. Prince of Orange caught fire and was burnt out the next day.
Seronie	Sweden	The ship was in collision with Adolphine Netherlands) off Gotland and sank. Three people were rescued by Adolphine. Seronie was on a voyage from Lübeck to Wyborg.
Thoburn	United Kingdom	The ship ran aground on Nickman's Ground. She was on a voyage from Liverpool, Lancashire to Saint Petersburg, Russia. She was refloated and taken in to Saint Petersburg in a leaky condition.
Veritas	United Kingdom	The ship ran aground off Læsø, Denmark. She was on a voyage from Danzig to Guernsey, Channel Islands. She was refloated and put in to Helsingør, Denmark.
Young	United Kingdom	The brig ran aground on the Gunfleet Sand, in the North Sea off the coast of Essex. She was on a voyage from Sunderland, County Durham to London. She was refloated and taken in to Harwich, Essex in a leaky condition.

== 20 September ==
List of shipwrecks: 20 September 1844
Ship	State	Description
Anna Maria	Norway	The ship struck the pier and sank at Kolberg. Her crew were rescued. She was on a voyage from Stavanger to Kolberg.
Little Family	United Kingdom	The fishing trawler was run down and sunk off Bury Head, Devon by Watersprite (United Kingdom) with the loss of three of her five crew.
Medora	United Kingdom	The ship ran aground on the Middle Sand, in the North Sea off the coast of Kent. She was on a voyage from Quebec City, Province of Canada, British North America to London. She was refloated the next day and resumed her voyage.
Saint Mungo	United Kingdom	The East Indiaman was wrecked off Cape L'Agulhas, Africa with the loss of ten of her crew. She was on a voyage from Calcutta, India to Newcastle upon Tyne, Northumberland.

== 21 September ==
List of shipwrecks: 21 September 1844
Ship	State	Description
Camilla	Norway	The ship was driven ashore and sank east of Calais, France. Her crew were rescued. She was on a voyage from a Norwegian port to Calais.

== 22 September ==
List of shipwrecks: 22 September 1844
Ship	State	Description
Kingston	United Kingdom	The ship was driven ashore at North Cape, Prince Edward Island, British North America. She was consequently condemned.
Wasp	United Kingdom	The ship was abandoned in the Atlantic Ocean. Her crew were rescued. She was on a voyage from Saint John, New Brunswick to Antigua.

== 23 September ==
List of shipwrecks: 23 September 1844
Ship	State	Description
Bella Emilia	Kingdom of Sardinia	The polacca was driven ashore at Buenos Aires, Argentina.
Betsy	United Kingdom	The ship was driven ashore at Peterhead, Aberdeenshire. She was on a voyage from Peterhead to Stettin. She was refloated and put back to Peterhead.
Clipper	United Kingdom	The ship was driven ashore in the Farne Islands, Northumberland. She was on a voyage from Cobh, County Cork to Newcastle upon Tyne, Northumberland. She was later refloated and resumed her voyage.
Magdilena	United Kingdom	The ship ran around and was damaged at Wells-next-the-Sea, Norfolk. She was on a voyage from Kiel, Prussia to Wells-next-the-Sea.
Susan	United Kingdom	The ship ran aground on the Cabezas Rocks, west of Tarifa, Spain. She was on a voyage from Newport, Monmouthshire to Malta. She was refloated and put into Gibraltar in a sinking condition.

== 24 September ==
List of shipwrecks: 24 September 1844
Ship	State	Description
Gazelle	(United Kingdom of Great Britain and Ireland) Bermuda	The ship departed from Antigua for Baltimore, Maryland, United States. No further trace, presumed foundered with the loss of all hands.
Jantina Eglina	Netherlands	The ship departed from Danzig for Rendsburg, Duchy of Schleswig. No further trace, presumed foundered with the loss of all hands.
L'Ecole	France	The brig foundered in the Atlantic Ocean. Her crew were rescued. She was on a voyage from Newfoundland, British North America to Granville, Manche.
Marwood	United Kingdom	The ship struck the Horn Reef. She was on a voyage from Cardiff, Glamorgan to Saint Petersburg, Russia. She was refloated and put in to Cuxhaven in a leaky condition.
Union	United Kingdom	The ship ran aground at South Shields, County Durham. She was on a voyage from Hamburg to South Shields.

== 25 September ==
List of shipwrecks: 25 September 1844
Ship	State	Description
Agnes	United Kingdom	The ship was driven ashore on Heneagua, Bahamas. She was on a voyage from St. Jago de Cuba. Cuba to Swansea, Glamorgan. She was refloated and put in to Cárdenas, Cuba, where she arrived on 2 October.
Empire	United Kingdom	The ship was beached on Flores Island, Azores. She was on a voyage from Cádiz, Spain to Castine, Maine, United States.
Mercury	United Kingdom	The brig was driven ashore at Clee Ness, Lincolnshire.
Yinbaireu or Yrribarren	Norway	The ship ran aground on the Gunfleet Sand, in the North Sea off the coast of Essex, United Kingdom. She was on a voyage from Bergen to Santander, Spain. She was refloated and taken in to Sheerness, Kent, United Kingdom.

== 26 September ==
List of shipwrecks: 26 September 1844
Ship	State	Description
Ant	United Kingdom	The ship was abandoned in the Atlantic Ocean. Her crew were rescued by William Horatio (United States). Ant was on a voyage from Saint Thomas, Virgin Islands to Saint John, New Brunswick, British North America.
Goede Hoop	Netherlands	The ship was driven ashore and wrecked at Thisted, Denmark. Her crew were rescued. She was on a voyage from Delfzijl, South Holland to a Norwegian port.
Hannah	United Kingdom	The ship ran aground on the Whelps Rock, in the River Shannon and capsized. She was on a voyage from Limerick to London.
Jarrow	United Kingdom	The ship ran aground off Helsingør, Denmark. She was on a voyage from London to Saint Petersburg, Russia. She was refloated and resumed her voyage.
Margaret and James	United Kingdom	The ship was driven ashore on Camel's Point, Anglesey. She was on a voyage from Newport, Monmouthshire to Liverpool. She was refloated and resumed her voyage.
Rapid	United Kingdom	The ship ran aground on Lindisfarne, Northumberland and was damaged. She was refloated and put in to North Sunderland, County Durham for repairs.

== 27 September ==
List of shipwrecks: 27 September 1844
Ship	State	Description
Æolus	Norway	The ship departed from Cardiff, Glamorgan, United Kingdom for New York, United States. No further trace, presumed foundered with the loss of all hands.
Annie Morice	United Kingdom	The ship capsized at Patras, Kingdom of Greece. She was refloated on 8 October.
British Settler	(United Kingdom of Great Britain and Ireland) Cape Colony	The ship was driven ashore and wrecked in the Rowie River.
Mary Ann	(United Kingdom of Great Britain and Ireland) Bahamas	The ship departed from Baltimore, Maryland, United States for Nassau. No further trace, presumed foundered with the loss of all hands.
Paragon	United States	The ship was abandoned whilst on a voyage from Manila, Spanish East Indies to Amoy, China. Her crew were rescued.
Pauline	Belgium	The ship was holed by an anchor and was beached at Wisbech, Cambridgeshire, United Kingdom.

== 28 September ==
List of shipwrecks: 28 September 1844
Ship	State	Description
Atalanta	Prussia	The brig was wrecked on Hogland, Russia.
Parisien	France	The ship foundered off the Newarp Lighthouse. Her crew were rescued by the brig Busick (United Kingdom). Parisien was on a voyage from Havre de Grâce, Seine-Inférieure to Newcastle upon Tyne, Northumberland, United Kingdom.
Syrian	United Kingdom	The brig was wrecked 12 nautical miles (22 km) north of Ichaboe Island, Portuguese West Africa. Her crew were rescued by boats from HMS Isis (Royal Navy).
Webster	United Kingdom	The ship was driven ashore on the south coast of Hogland. She was refloated on 10 October but drove ashore on the north coast. Her crew were rescued.

== 29 September ==
List of shipwrecks: 29 September 1844
Ship	State	Description
Abigale	United States	The fishing schooner was lost in a gale in the area of Hyannis, Massachusetts.
Alexander Liddle	United Kingdom	The ship was driven ashore on Catati Island, in the Sea of Marmara. She was refloated and put into Constantinople, Ottoman Empire for repairs.
Catharine	United Kingdom	The ship was wrecked near Bayeux, Calvados, France. Her crew were rescued.
Elizabeth Jane	United Kingdom	The collier, a brig, was driven ashore at Ottendorf, Duchy of Schleswig. She was refloated. She was later refloated.
Galaxie	United States	The fishing schooner was lost in a gale in the area of Hyannis, Massachusetts.
Good Intent	United Kingdom	The ship was driven ashore at Scarbaorough, Yorkshire. She was on a voyage from Blyth, Northumberland to Bridlington, Yorkshire.
Joseph Randolph	United States	The fishing schooner was lost in a gale in the area of Hyannis, Massachusetts.
Martha	United States	The fishing schooner was lost in a gale in the area of Hyannis, Massachusetts.
Orum	United States	The fishing schooner was lost in a gale in the area of Hyannis, Massachusetts.
Panther	United States	The fishing schooner was lost in a gale in the area of Hyannis, Massachusetts.
Pearl	United States	The fishing schooner was lost in a gale in the area of Hyannis, Massachusetts.
Resolve	United States	The fishing schooner was lost in a gale in the area of Hyannis, Massachusetts.
Venus	(United Kingdom of Great Britain and Ireland) British North America	The ship was driven ashore at Baie Verte, Newfoundland. She was on a voyage from Pictou, Nova Scotia to Miramichi, New Brunswick.
Vivid	United Kingdom	The ship was driven ashore at Filey, Yorkshire. She was refloated on 9 October but drove ashore again and was wrecked. Her crew were rescued.

== 30 September ==
List of shipwrecks: 30 September 1844
Ship	State	Description
Duchess of Cleveland	United Kingdom	The ship ran aground on the Barber Sand, in the North Sea off the coast of Norfolk. She was later refloated.
Edward	Sweden	The ship was wrecked on a sandbank east of Gräsö. Her crew were rescued. She was on a voyage from Skellefteå to Barcelona, Spain.
Eleonore	Rostock	The ship was driven ashore near Thisted, Denmark. She was on a voyage from Schiedam, South Holland, Netherlands to Rostck.
Friendship	United Kingdom	The ship was driven ashore and wrecked at Campbeltown, Argyllshire. She was on a voyage from Ayr to London.
Henry	United Kingdom	The ship was wrecked on Læsø, Denmark. Her crew were rescued. She was on a voyage from "Wyburg" to Hull, Yorkshire.
Hester and Hannah	United Kingdom	The ship was driven ashore at Ness Point, Suffolk. She was refloated the next day.
Ida	France	The ship was driven ashore on Læsø, Denmark. She was on a voyage from Saint Petersburg, Russia to Havre de Grâce, Seine-Inférieure. She had become a wreck by 6 October.
Marabout	France	The ship ran aground on the Goodwin Sands, Kent, United Kingdom. She was on a voyage from Newcastle upon Tyne, Northumberland, United Kingdom to Nantes, Loire-Inférieure. She was refloated and put in to Calais in a leaky condition.
Nancy	United Kingdom	The ship was wrecked on Læsø. Her rew were rescued. She was on a voyage from Saint Petersburg to Great Yarmouth, Norfolk.
Oreni	United Kingdom	The ship was wrecked at "Sikhjelma".

== Unknown date ==
List of shipwrecks: Unknown date in September 1844
Ship	State	Description
Dædalus	United Kingdom	The ship was driven ashore on Gotland, Sweden. She was on a voyage from Kronstadt, Russia to Leith, Lothian. She was refloated and put in to Copenhagen, Denmark, where she arrived on 26 September.
Diana	United Kingdom	The ship was lost near "Swartopulo", in the Black Sea before 27 September.
Elizabeth and Jane	United Kingdom	The ship was wrecked at Circular Head, Van Diemen's Land before 3 September. She was on a voyage from London to Launceston, Van Diemen's Land.
Emerald	(United Kingdom of Great Britain and Ireland) British North America	The ship was abandoned in the Atlantic Ocean before 28 September. She was on a voyage from Liverpool, Lancashire to Pugwash, Nova Scotia.
Gilmour	United Kingdom	The ship was driven ashore on Stronsay, Orkney Islands. She was on a voyage from Hull, Yorkshire to Quebec City, Province of Canada, British North America. She was refloated on 7 September and departed to the south to be repaired.
Harriet	United Kingdom	The ship was wrecked at the mouth of the Yangtze in mid-September. Her crew were rescued.
Lord of the Isles	United Kingdom	The ship was driven ashore at Fishing Ship Harbour, Newfoundland, British North America before 21 September. Subsequently repaired.
Magnet	(United Kingdom of Great Britain and Ireland) New Zealand	The ship was wrecked at Muckaroa before 12 September. All on board were rescued.
Ouri	Norway	The ship was wrecked near Gävle, Sweden.
Plym	United Kingdom	The ship was lost on Belle Isle before 1 October.
Q. E. D.	United Kingdom	The collier, an auxiliary barque, ran aground on the Gunfleet Sand, in the North Sea off the coast of Essex in late September. She was on a voyage from Newcastle upon Tyne, Northumberland to London. She was later refloated and resumed her voyage.
Simpliciti	Portugal	The brig was wrecked in Damborg Bay.
Swift	United Kingdom	The ship was wrecked on the St. Mary's Key Rocks before 9 September. She was on a voyage from Pictou, Nova Scotia to Saint John's, Newfoundland, British North America.
HMS Swiftsure	Royal Navy	The Swiftsure-class ship of the line heeled over and sank at Portchester, Hampshire.
