= Cape Cod Academy =

Prep school in Osterville, Massachusetts, US

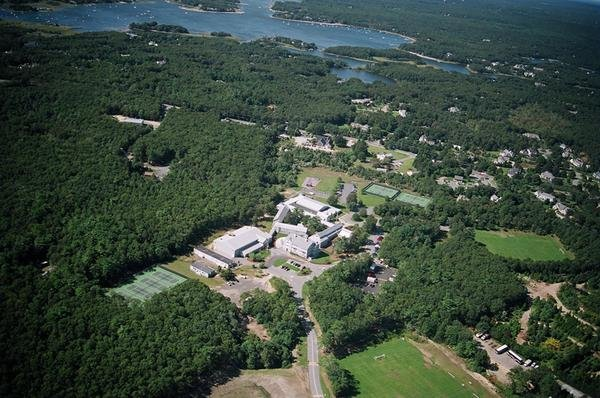
- Cape Cod Academy from the air

Location
- 50 Osterville-West Barnstable Road; Osterville, Massachusetts; 41°38′30.75″N 70°23′20.43″W

Information
- School type: Private
- Established: 1976; 50 years ago
- Head of school: Julie Salit
- Teaching staff: 35.8
- Grades: K-12
- Gender: coed
- Enrollment: 318 (2021-2022)
- Average class size: 12 students
- Hours in school day: 8 AM to 3:00 PM
- Campus size: 46 acres (190,000 m^{2})
- Colors: Blue & White
- Athletics conference: Cape and Islands League
- Mascot: Seahawk
- Accreditations: NEASC, NAIS, AISNE
- Website: https://www.capecodacademy.org/

Cape Cod Academy (CCA) is an independent coed college preparatory school for grades kindergarten through 12 located in Osterville, Massachusetts. The academy was incorporated in 1976 and functions on a school preparatory curriculum.

== Statistics ==
According to the academy, 100% of graduates are accepted into four-year colleges.

== Advanced Placement Courses ==
Cape Cod Academy offers Advanced Placement Courses from the College Board including, AP Calculus AB, AP Calculus BC, AP Microeconomics, AP Physics, AP Art History, AP English Language and Composition, AP English Language and literature, AP U.S. History, AP Biology, AP Computer Science, AP Spanish, AP Statistics, AP Chemistry, AP Government.

== Summer Activities ==
Cape Cod Academy opened its first day camp during the summer of 2013. Cape Cod Academy hosts several different summer programs throughout the summer, from June through August. The programs are open to CCA students and non-CCA students.

Cape Cod Academy offers summer tutoring to all K-12 students, regardless of whether they attend the academy or not.
