= John F. Kennedy Presidential Library and Museum =

Library and museum in Boston

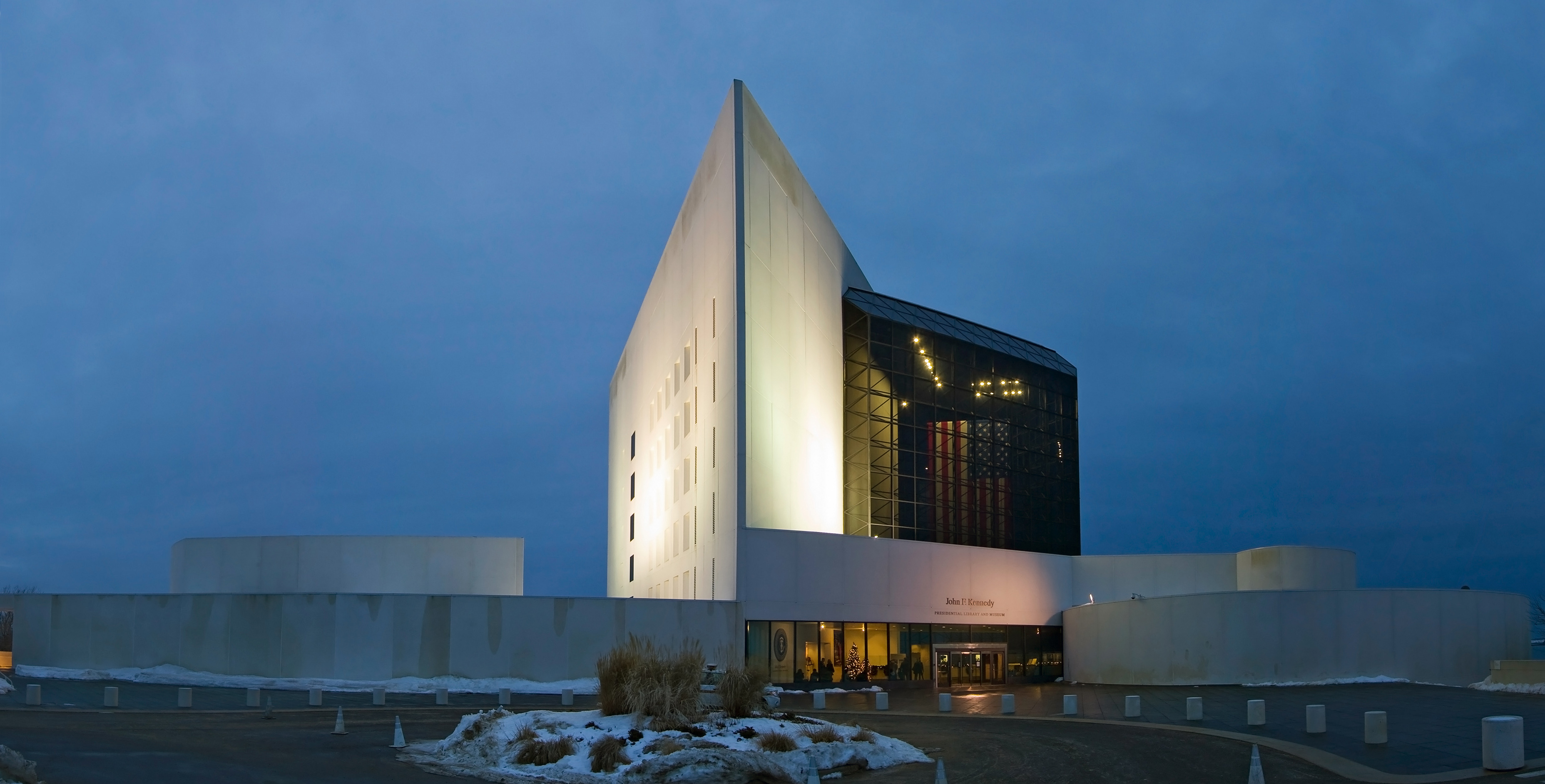

- Location within Massachusetts

General information
- Location: Boston, Suffolk County, Massachusetts, United States
- Coordinates: 42°18′57.21″N 71°2′2.71″W
- Named for: John Fitzgerald Kennedy (1917–1963)
- Construction started: August 1977; 49 years ago Groundbreaking: June 12, 1977; 49 years ago
- Inaugurated: Dedicated on October 20, 1979; 46 years ago Rededicated on October 29, 1993; 32 years ago
- Cost: $20.8 million
- Operator: National Archives and Records Administration

Technical details
- Size: 10 acres (40,000 m^{2})

Design and construction
- Architect: I. M. Pei

Website
- jfklibrary.org

The John F. Kennedy Presidential Library and Museum is the presidential library and museum of John F. Kennedy (1917–1963), the 35th president of the United States from 1961 to 1963. It is located on Columbia Point in the Dorchester neighborhood of Boston, Massachusetts, next to the University of Massachusetts Boston, the Edward M. Kennedy Institute for the United States Senate, and the Massachusetts Archives and Commonwealth Museum. Designed by the architect I. M. Pei, the building is the official repository for original papers and correspondence of the Kennedy Administration, as well as special bodies of published and unpublished materials, such as books and papers by and about Ernest Hemingway. The library contains approximately 400,000 photographs, 9,400 video recordings, 24 million documents, and 9,000 audio recordings related to Kennedy's presidency.

The library and museum are part of the Presidential Library System, which is administered by the Office of Presidential Libraries, a part of the National Archives and Records Administration. The library and museum were dedicated in 1979 by President Jimmy Carter and members of the Kennedy family.

== History ==
=== Original site and name ===
During a weekend visit to Boston on October 19, 1963, President Kennedy and John Carl Warnecke, the architect who designed Kennedy's Tomb of the Eternal Flame at Arlington National Cemetery viewed several possible locations offered by Harvard University as a site for the library and museum. At the time, there were only four other presidential libraries: the Hoover Presidential Library, the Franklin D. Roosevelt Library, the Truman Library, and the Dwight D. Eisenhower Library. They were all scattered around the country in small towns from New York to Iowa. Kennedy had not decided on any design concept yet, but he felt that the existing presidential libraries were placed too "far away from scholarly resources."

Kennedy chose a plot of land next to the Harvard Graduate School of Business Administration. The building would face the Charles River which was a few feet away, and on the other side of which, the dormitories that included Winthrop House where Kennedy spent his upperclassman days.

Since Kennedy encouraged his administration to save effects of both personal and official nature, the complex would not just be a collection of the President's papers, but "a complete record of a Presidential era." Therefore, the building would have the word "museum" appended to its name as the John F. Kennedy Presidential Library and Museum.

=== Initial progress ===
After President Kennedy was assassinated in November 1963, his family and friends discussed how to construct a library that would serve as a fitting memorial. A committee was formed to advise Kennedy's widow Jacqueline, who would make the final decision. The group deliberated for months, and visited with architects from around the world including Pietro Belluschi and others from the United States, Brazil's Lucio Costa, and Italy's Franco Albini. Mrs. Kennedy and others met with the candidates together at the Kennedy Compound in Hyannis, Massachusetts, and visited several in their offices. The committee also conducted a secretive process whereby the architects voted anonymously for the most capable of their colleagues.

After the assassination, Cambridge residents actively opposed the Kennedy family's efforts to build a presidential library at Harvard Square due to traffic concerns. On January 13, 1964, Attorney General Robert F. Kennedy announced that a taped oral-history project was to be undertaken for inclusion in the library. The project would feature administration staff, friends, family, and politicians from home and abroad. The Attorney General also announced that Eugene R. Black Sr. agreed to serve as chairman of the board of trustees and that $1 million of Black's $10 million goal had been given to the trust by the Joseph P. Kennedy Jr. Foundation.

By March of that year $4.3 million had been pledged, including 18,727 unsolicited donations from the public. Large donations came from the Hispanic world with Venezuela pledging $100,000 and Governor of Puerto Rico Luis Muñoz Marín offering the same. The oral-history project also began recording, starting with Jacqueline Kennedy and Robert Kennedy. Originally projected to consist of interviews with 150 people, 178 had agreed to participate and the total number of expected participants doubled to 300.

Fourteen architects were named to serve on a design advisory committee:

Americans	Base
Pietro Belluschi	Dean of the MIT School of Architecture
Louis Kahn	University of Pennsylvania Architecture School
I. M. Pei	New York City
Mies van der Rohe	Chicago
Hugh Stubbins	Cambridge
Paul Thiry	Seattle
Benjamin C. Thompson	Cambridge
John C. Warnecke	Washington
Overseas	Base
Alvar Aalto	Finland
Franco Albini	Italy
Lucio Costa	Brazil
Sven Markelius	Sweden
Sir Basil Spence	England
Kenzo Tange	Japan

Over the following months pledges continued to funnel in for the building still being conceptualized by the various architects. Some notable donations include $900,000 handed over to Postmaster General John A. Gronouski on July 9, 1964. It was the sum of a campaign encompassing 102 Federal agencies. Gronouski said many of the Federal employee contributions were in the form of a $5 withholding each payday for a period of three years. The next day the Indian ambassador to the United States, Braj Kumar Nehru. presented Black with a check for $100,000 during a ceremony at the River Club. Nehru said that the Indian people were hit by a "sad blow" when the President died, and that they held him "in the highest regard, esteem and affection." He desired for Indian students abroad in the United States to use the library, then still planned for construction at Harvard along the banks of the Charles River.

=== Pei selected as architect ===
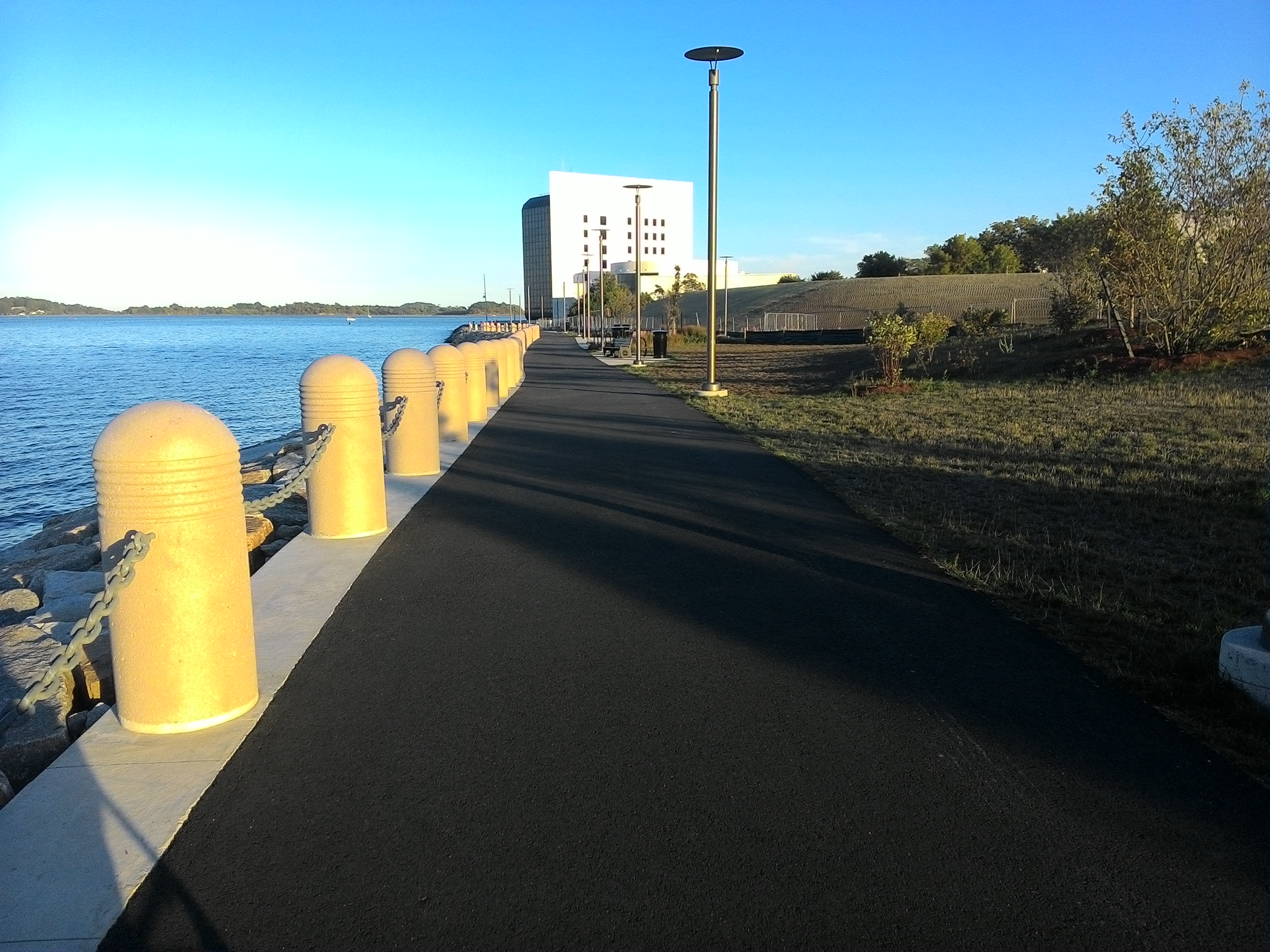
The John F, Kennedy Presidential Library and Museum as seen from the Boston Harborwalk on the Columbia Point segment

On December 13, 1964, the Kennedy family announced that I. M. Pei was unanimously chosen by a subcommittee as the architect of the library. Even though Pei was relatively unknown amongst the list of candidates, Mrs. Kennedy, who viewed him as filled with promise and imagination and after spending several months inspecting the many architects' offices and creations, selected him to create the vision she held for the project. Pei did not have a design yet, but the idea as described by Robert Kennedy was to "stimulate interest in politics". Meanwhile, the suggestion that Harvard may not be a suitable site for the library had begun cropping up. When asked if Pei may have had to start from scratch, he said this was the case. With an "encouraging grin" Robert Kennedy simply wished Mr. Pei "Good luck".

Mrs. Kennedy chose Pei to design the library, based on two considerations. First, she appreciated the variety of ideas he had used for earlier projects. "He didn't seem to have just one way to solve a problem", she said. "He seemed to approach each commission thinking only of it and then develop a way to make something beautiful." Kennedy made her choice based on her personal connection with Pei. Calling it "really an emotional decision", she explained: "He was so full of promise, like Jack; they were born in the same year. I decided it would be fun to take a great leap with him."

Not long before Pei was selected, the $10 million goal set by Black had been reached. By 1965, fundraising was suspended when the contributions reached $20 million.

=== Years of setbacks ===
In January 1966, when Massachusetts governor John A. Volpe signed a bill allowing the state to purchase the land for the site—an old train yard belonging to the Massachusetts Bay Transit Authority (MBTA)—it was expected that the project would be complete by 1970. The original design was a large complex comprising the John F. Kennedy Library and Museum, the John F. Kennedy School of Government, and an Institute of Politics. The project faced many delays. The MBTA would not agree to remove the heavy machinery from the land until 1970. By that time construction costs had risen to over $20 million. Only now could Pei prepare a six-month study of the site's soil, and he said the "money we had six years ago, today will barely pay for 60 percent of the original plans."

Robert Kennedy, by then a senator from New York, had been serving as president of the John F. Kennedy Library Corporation until he was assassinated in 1968. Weeks before, William Manchester and Harper & Row donated $750,000 to the library. The first in a series of installments expected to total $5 million, came from the profits of the 1967 book The Death of a President which caused a bitter feud between the Kennedys and Manchester. Mrs. Kennedy remarked "I think it is so beautiful what Mr. Manchester did. I am glad that Senator Kennedy knew about it before he died." The youngest of the Kennedy brothers, Senator Edward M. Kennedy, stepped down as vice president of the corporation to fill the newly vacant position.

By 1971, construction had still not begun; researchers and scholars were forced to work out of the Federal Records Center which was temporarily housing some of the 15 million documents and manuscripts. Pei said there was finally "a clear way ahead". He was asked to save on construction expenses by using inexpensive materials. This would translate into Pei working with concrete instead of his preferred stone.

On May 22, 1971, President Lyndon B. Johnson, who succeeded Kennedy as president, saw the dedication of the Lyndon Baines Johnson Library and Museum in Austin, Texas.

Meanwhile, the Cambridge community was in fierce opposition to having the library being built in Cambridge at all. Although originally welcomed in 1965, the library was now seen as a great attractor of over a million annual tourists who would change the neighborhood with "hordes of tourists, automobiles, fast-food franchises and souvenir shops", as well as cause a negative environmental impact. A neighborhood group filed a lawsuit in federal court demanding that the General Services Administration study, which found that the great number of visitors would have "no adverse effect on the area," be reexamined.

Stephen E. Smith, a Kennedy in-law who heads the John F. Kennedy Library Corporation decided that "we want the Kennedy Library to be a happy place. It would not be in keeping with the nature of this memorial for it to open in an atmosphere of discord and controversy." In February 1975 the plans for having the library where President Kennedy would have wanted it, were dropped.

=== New location, new plan ===
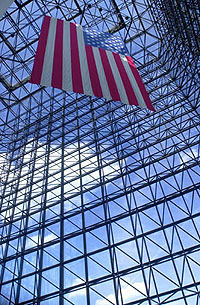
From the pavilion (pictured), designer I. M. Pei says there is a restricted access area that offers the best view in the complex.

In 1975, the John F. Kennedy Presidential Library Corporation announced that it would locate the library on a 10-acre site offered by the University of Massachusetts Boston adjacent to its campus on the Columbia Point peninsula, and was described as a group of "massive, blocky structures...in sharp contrast to the mellow and urbane atmosphere of the library's original site near Harvard Square." The site was originally a garbage dump; Pei recalls finding old refrigerators and appliances under the soil. In all seriousness, he asserted that one could toss a lit match on the earth and watch the ground ignite as the soil emitted methane gas.

June 12, 1977, marked the official groundbreaking for the library with construction following in August. The site overlooks Boston, Dorchester Bay and the ocean. The area was covered in 15 feet (4.6 m) of earth and topsoil. Pei was particularly proud of the landscaping results.

The design would be a simple geometric structure with a large glass pavilion. The concrete tower stands 125 feet (38 m) tall and houses offices and archives. A circular section contains two theaters and is connected to the tower by the 115 foot (35 m) grey-glass pavilion. The concrete finish of the building directly reflects the budget. With more money Pei would have made the building with stone which he believes offers a nicer finish with more detail. The materials chosen kept the costs within budget, in total costing $20.8 million.

Over 30 million people contributed to the cost of construction, which more than 225 construction workers labored to complete before the end of 1979.

=== Dedication ===
The dedication was held on October 20, 1979. Outside the building on the green, on a blue-carpeted stage with a bank of yellow chrysanthemums sat the Kennedy family and those close to them. Among many others, President Jimmy Carter was in their company. The ceremony began with President Kennedy's daughter, Caroline Kennedy, introducing her brother, John F. Kennedy Jr., who read from the Stephen Spender poem, "I Think Continually of Those Who Were Truly Great".

President Carter said of John F. Kennedy that he embodied "the ideals of a generation as few public figures have ever done in the history of the earth." He spoke of openly weeping upon hearing about the death of Kennedy, something that he had not done since his own father died, ten years before. Afterwards, he accepted the library "on behalf of the American people" and the National Archives and Records Administration.

Senator Edward M. Kennedy, said of his brother's life, that it "was a voyage of discovery, a quest for excellence that inspired universal trust and faith. In that brief unfinished journey, he made us believe once more in the great historic purpose of this land. He filled America with pride and made the nation young again."

Critics generally liked the finished building, but the architect himself was unsatisfied. The years of conflict and compromise had changed the nature of the design, and Pei felt that the final result lacked its original passion. "I wanted to give something very special to the memory of President Kennedy", he said in 2000. "It could and should have been a great project." Perhaps the most important consequence of the Kennedy project for Pei was his elevation in the public's consciousness as an architect of note. Pei considered the John F. Kennedy Library "the most important commission in my life."

=== Temporary closure ===
During the federal mass layoffs, the library was closed until further notice on February 18, 2025, at approximately 2:00 PM. The reason given was "Due to an executive order". The library reopened the next day with free admission.

== Exhibits and collection ==
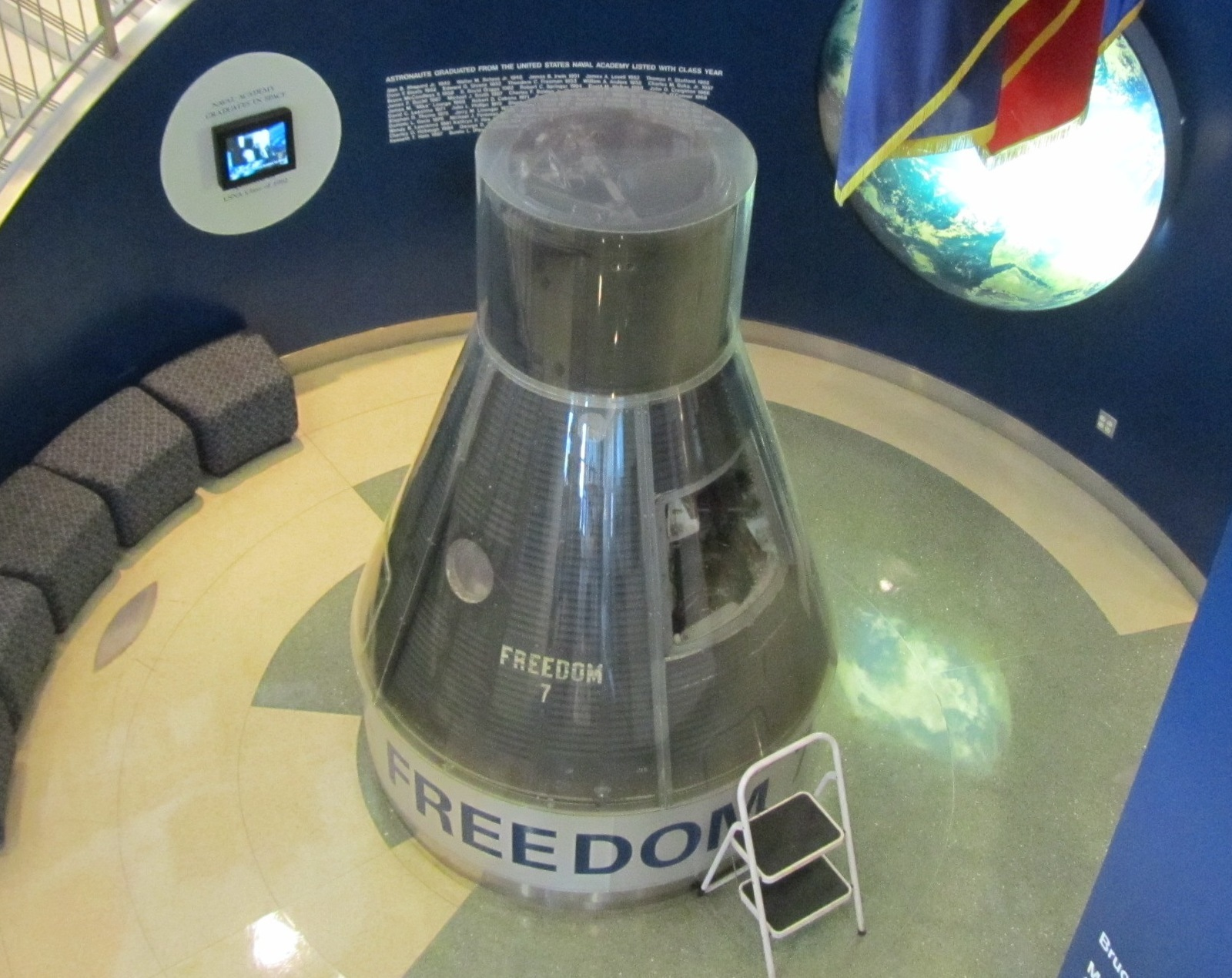
Freedom 7, flown in 1961 by Alan Shepard to become the first American in space (formerly on display at the U.S. Naval Academy), displayed at the Kennedy Library until 2021, when it was moved to the Smithsonian.

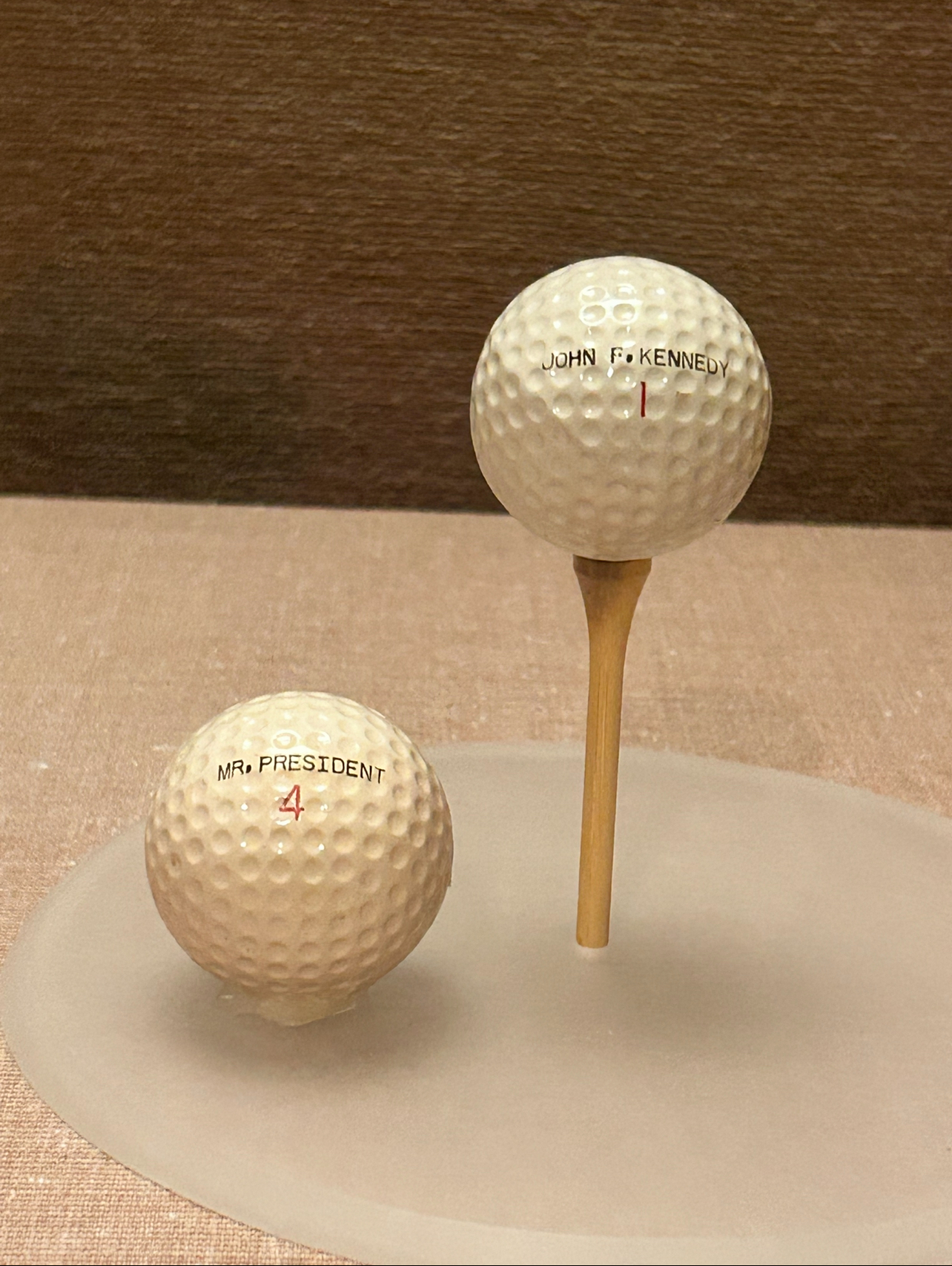
President Kennedy's golf balls on display at the John F. Kennedy Presidential Library and Museum in Boston

The library's first floor features a museum containing video monitors, family photographs, political memorabilia. Visitors to the museum begin their visit by watching a film narrated by President Kennedy in one of two cinemas that show an orientation film, and a third shows a documentary on the Cuban Missile Crisis.

There are seven permanent exhibits:

- Campaign Trail – Exhibit on the presidential campaign of 1960 and New Frontier, featuring 1960 Democratic National Convention memorabilia, and a replica of a Kennedy campaign office.
- The Briefing Room – Exhibit on Kennedy's speeches and press conferences.
- The Space Race – Exhibit on the Space Race and the U.S. space program during Project Mercury; features the Mercury-Redstone 3 (Freedom 7) space capsule in which astronaut Alan B. Shepard became the first American in space. The capsule, which was displayed at the United States Naval Academy's Armel-Leftwich Visitor Center from 1998 to 2012, came to the JFK Library in 2012, and returned to the Smithsonian Institution's National Air and Space Museum in Washington, D.C., in 2021.
- Attorney General's Office – Exhibit on Attorney General Robert F. Kennedy, President Kennedy's brother and closest political advisor. Features information on RFK's role in fighting organized crime as chief counsel for the Senate McClellan Committee, and the Department of Justice's role in the American Civil Rights Movement during RFK's time as attorney general. The centerpiece of the exhibit are items that RFK had in his office at the Department of Justice Building. These include documents, personal items, and a bust of Winston Churchill by Leo Cherne.
- The Oval Office – Exhibit features information on the American Civil Rights Movement during the Kennedy presidency, items that Kennedy kept in the Oval Office, and a replica of the Resolute desk.
- First Lady Jacqueline Bouvier Kennedy – Exhibit on the life of First Lady Jacqueline Bouvier Kennedy; features footage of the First Lady and artifacts from her life, include several pieces of clothing.
- The Kennedy Family – This exhibit on the famous Kennedy family features a number of artifacts, including Kathleen Kennedy's Red Cross uniform jacket, a commemorative cup, a blackthorn walking stick, and a replica of the Great Mace of Galway, Ireland.

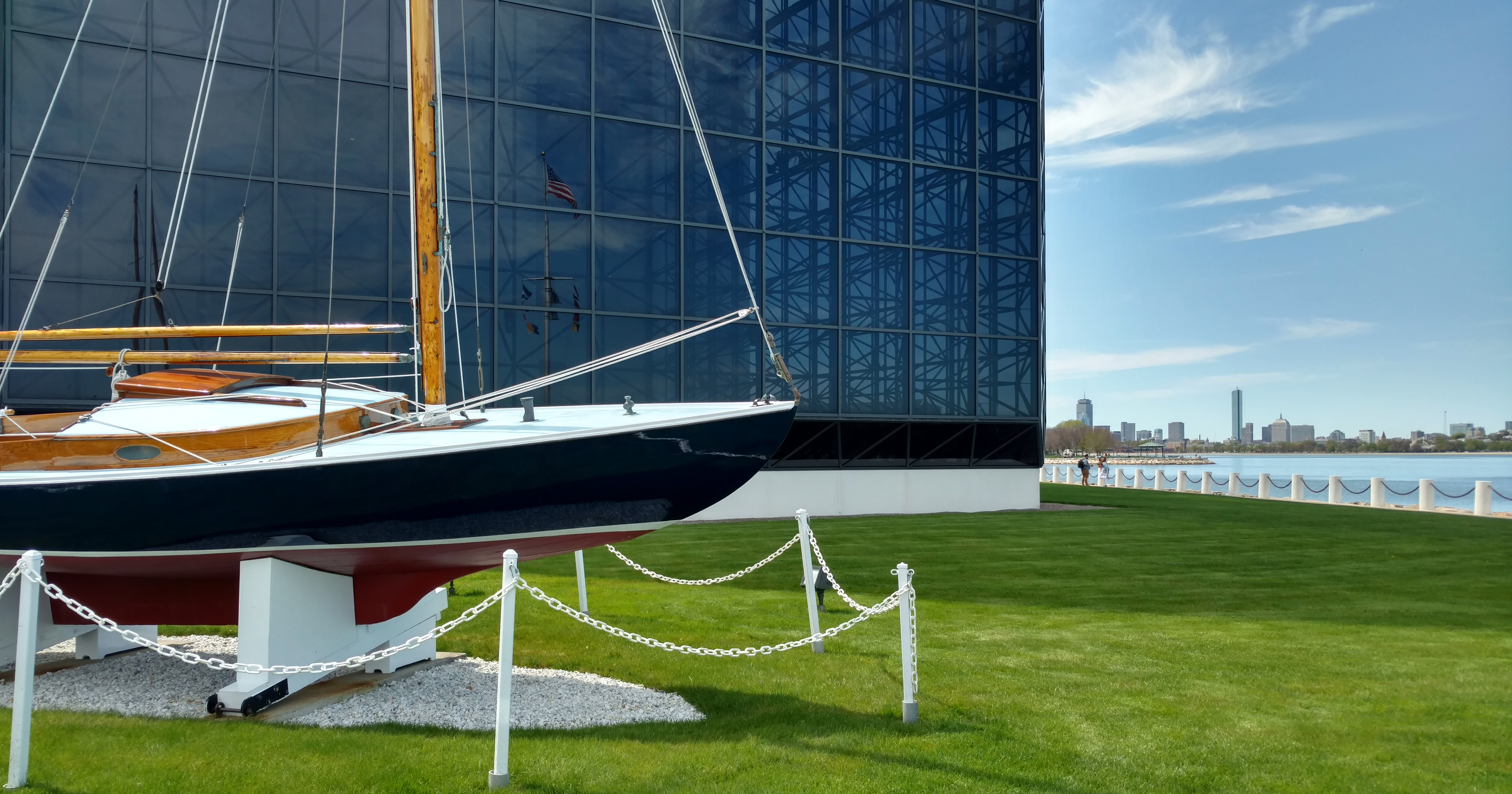
The sailboat Victura and the exterior of the library

Among the library's art collection is a 1962 portrait of Robert F. Kennedy by Lajos Markos, a watercolor sketch of John F. Kennedy by Jamie Wyeth, a watercolor painting of the White House painted by Jacqueline Kennedy and given as a gift to her husband, who had it hung in the Oval Office, a fingerpainting by Caroline Kennedy as a child, and a bust of John F. Kennedy sculpted by Felix de Weldon.

Kennedy's 25-foot Wianno Senior sailboat Victura is on display on the grounds of the library from May to October. Acquired by the family when Kennedy was 15, it played an important role in forging sibling bonds and, after the president's death, continued being sailed by other members of the family, especially race-enthusiast brother Ted.

The library has a variety of temporary and special exhibits.

== Archives ==
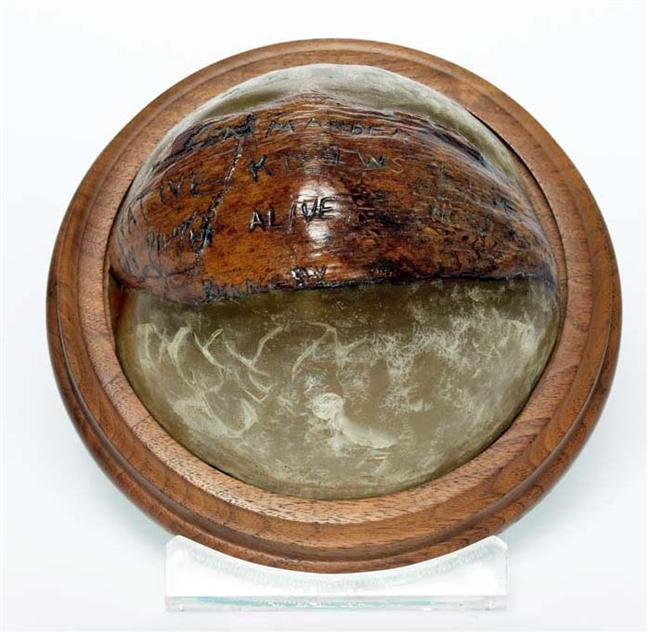
President Kennedy had the coconut made into a paperweight. It sat on the Resolute desk, which Kennedy used in the Oval Office. The message reads: "NAURO ISL… COMMANDER… NATIVE KNOWS POS'IT… HE CAN PILOT… 11 ALIVE… NEED SMALL BOAT… KENNEDY"

=== Audiovisual ===
The audiovisual archives contain over 400,000 still photographs taken from 1863 to 1984, over 7.5 million feet (2,300,000 m) of film shot between 1910 and 1983, and 11,000 reels of audio recordings from 1910 to 1985.

=== Oral-history project ===
Begun in 1964, the oral-history project was a unique undertaking to document and preserve interviews with those associated with Kennedy. Initially expected to have about 150 participants, today it contains over 1,100 interviews and continues to this day. It is modelled after a program by the Columbia University Oral History Research Office, the world's oldest, which began in 1948. At its conception, while serving as Attorney General, Robert Kennedy speculated that some of the interviews, such as ones relating to the Cuban Missile Crisis, might have to be sealed for a while due to containing "highly classified material." He said that although the emphasis would be on releasing everything as soon as possible, some items might remain closed for 10 to 25 years.

Because the interviewees are allowed to review their transcripts before the interviews are released for use by scholars, the audio may differ from the written record so that the interviewees may disambiguate any misunderstanding in their speech and make it clear in a written form.

=== Artifacts ===
The library keeps a wide range of artifacts, many of which can be found in their respective exhibits. One is the original coconut on which a rescue message was inscribed by Kennedy to rescue the crew of the PT-109, which was delivered to coastwatcher Reginald Evans by Biuku Gasa and Eroni Kumana, natives of the Solomon Islands.

== The Ernest Hemingway Collection ==
The library is also home to a collection of documents and belongings from Ernest Hemingway. The collection was established in 1968 following an exchange of letters between Hemingway's widow Mary and Jacqueline Kennedy that confirmed that Hemingway's papers would be archived there. In 1961, despite a U.S. travel ban to Cuba, President Kennedy had arranged to allow Mary Hemingway to go there to claim her recently deceased husband's documents and belongings. A room for the collection was dedicated on July 18, 1980, by Patrick Hemingway and Jacqueline Kennedy Onassis.

The Ernest Hemingway Collection spans Hemingway's career, and includes "ninety percent of existing Hemingway manuscript materials, making the Kennedy Library the world's principal center for research" on his life and work. It includes:

- Over 1000 manuscripts of varying lengths, including hand-written drafts of The Sun Also Rises and dozens of hand-drafted alternate endings to A Farewell to Arms
- Research material on bullfighting, used as background for Death in the Afternoon and The Dangerous Summer
- Thousands of letters written by or to Hemingway; this included correspondence with fellow writers such as Sherwood Anderson, Carlos Baker, John Dos Passos, William Faulkner, F. Scott Fitzgerald, Robert Frost, Martha Gellhorn, A. E. Hotchner, James Joyce, Archibald MacLeish, Ezra Pound, and Gertrude Stein, as well as with actress Marlene Dietrich, restaurateur Toots Shor, Cardinal Francis Spellman, publisher Charles Scribner, his editor Maxwell Perkins, and his lawyer Alfred Rice
- More than 10,000 photographs, as well as press clippings and other ephemera
- Books from his private library, many with marginalia, and including a rare copy of Francisco Goya's Los Proverbios

== Incidents ==
In 2013, a fire occurred in the library. Reports initially stated that the fire appeared to have started in a mechanical room.

In 2022, a window washer fell to his death in the building's pavilion.

== See also ==
- List of memorials to John F. Kennedy
- Presidential memorials in the United States
