= Charles Bilezikian =

American businessman

Charles Gregory Bilezikian (March 11, 1937 – July 26, 2016) was an American businessman, retail executive and philanthropist, who co-founded the Christmas Tree Shops retail chain with his wife, Doreen, in 1970.

== Early life and education ==
Bilezikian was born to Armenian parents Beatrice (née Kasparian) and Krikor Bilezikian. His father, a tailor, died when he was a teenager. Following her husband's death, Bilezikian's mother took a job as a clerk in a Grover Cronin store in Waltham, Massachusetts. Charles Bilezikian graduated from Newton High School in Newton, Massachusetts. He received his bachelor's degree from Suffolk University. He entered the retail business soon after college and married his wife, Doreen Portnoy.

== Career ==
Christmas Tree Shops grew to 23 retail locations by 2003, the year the Bilezikian family sold the chain to Bed Bath & Beyond for an estimated $200 million. Charles Bilezikian soon created the Bilezikian Family Foundation to pursue philanthropic efforts. Charles Bilezikian also served on the board of directors for the Armenian Missionary Association of America, where he helped refurbish a hospital and create a dental clinic, kindergarten, and a community center.

== Later life ==
Charles and Doreen Bilezikian lived simultaneously in both Osterville, Massachusetts, and Palm Beach, Florida, during his later life. Charles Bilezikian died from pancreatic cancer at his home in Osterville, Massachusetts, on July 26, 2016, at the age of 79. He was survived by his wife of 52 years, and two sons, Jeffrey and Gregory. He was buried in Newton Cemetery in Newton, Massachusetts.
