= Wianno Senior =

Sloop

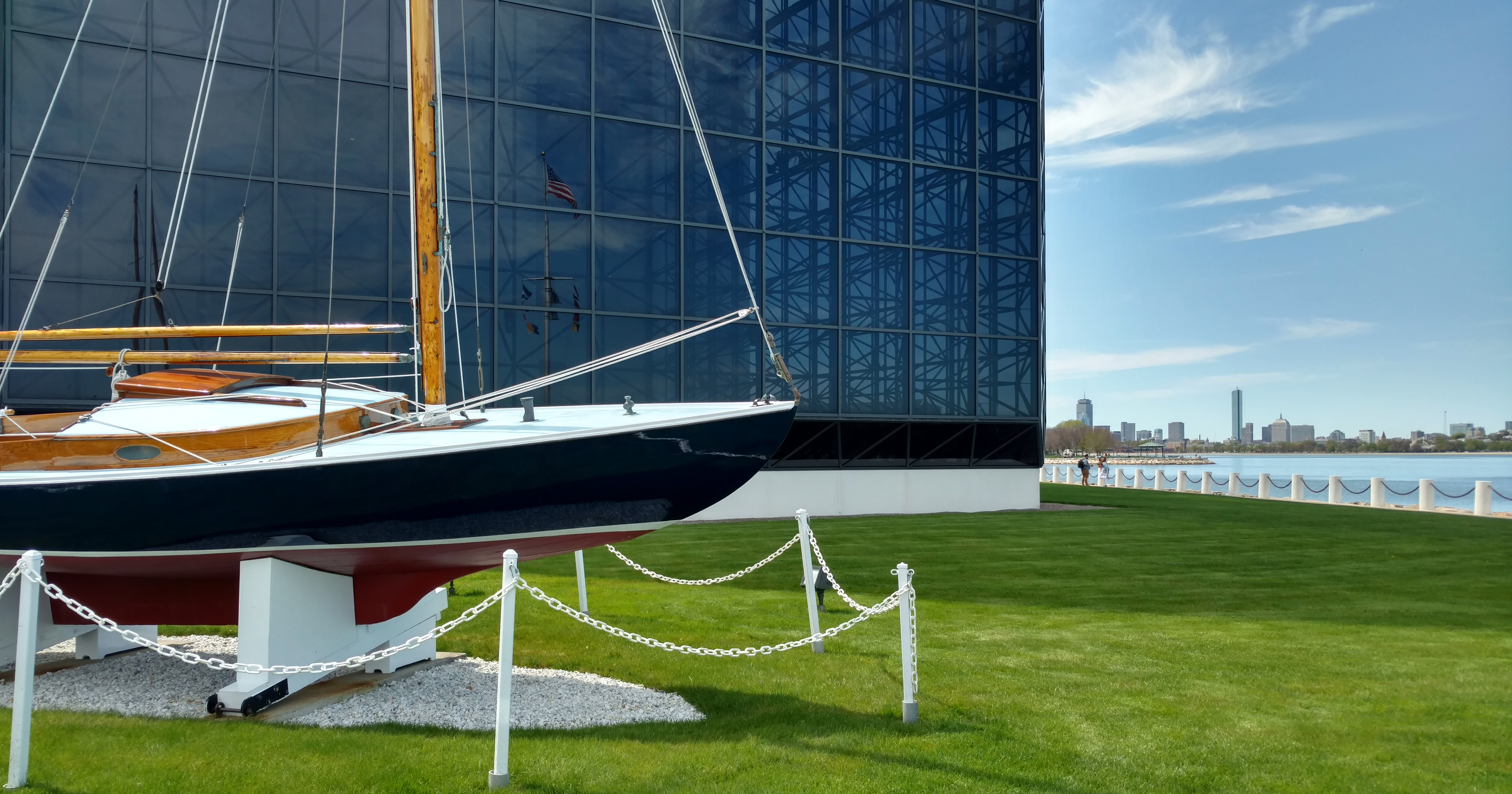
John F Kennedy Wianno Senior Victura at the Kennedy Library in Boston

The Wianno Senior is a 25-foot (7.6 m) gaff rigged sloop, designed as a class racer in 1913-14 and still raced on Nantucket Sound by four Cape Cod yacht clubs.

== Design ==
The boat was designed in 1913−14 in the village of Osterville, Cape Cod, Massachusetts, for a group of sailors from the Wianno Yacht Club. They requested Horace Manley Crosby to design a sailboat for racing on Nantucket Sound. Manley Crosby was a member of the Crosby family, noted for building the famous Crosby catboats. Fourteen boats were delivered and raced that summer: No. 1 Dione, No. 2 Wendy, No. 3 Telemark, No. 4 A.P.H., No. 5 Commy, No. 6 Snookums, No. 7 Bob White, No. 8 Sea Dog, No. 9 Marie, No. 10 Qui Vive, No. 11 Fantasy, No. 12 Whistle Wing, No. 13 Maxixe, and No. 14 Ethyl.

According to The Senior, privately published in 1989 for the boat's 75th anniversary, all but two of the original boats have been lost, variously to deterioration, fires, or hurricanes. No. 7, known as Tirza, was in Osterville, and No. 11, Fantasy, was in the collections of Mystic Seaport Museum in Mystic, Connecticut.

That history of the class was adapted from the article "Warriors of Wianno", published in Cape Cod Life, April/May 1987.

At about the same time, Wooden Boat magazine published two articles on the Wianno Senior as part of the boat's 75th anniversary. The first, "The Wianno Senior", describes the boat's history and construction and includes several photos. Page 66 shows a photo of the most famous Wianno Senior sailor, President John F. Kennedy, who kept his boat, Victura (hull no. 94, built in 1932), at the family compound in Hyannisport, Massachusetts. Today, it is on display at the Kennedy Library in the Dorchester neighborhood of Boston.

A second article in that issue of Wooden Boat, Tuning Up with Jack Fallon, provides a short tutorial on how to sail a Wianno Senior. Jack won the Scudder Cup, the annual class championship, a record nine times between the Cup's establishment in 1949 and 1976.

== Production ==
About 200 Wianno Seniors have been built. Hull numbers through 173 were wooden boats; subsequent boats have been built of fiberglass.

A DVD provides a video history of the Wianno Senior class, including the recovery of the class from the devastating boat yard fire on December 10, 2003, in which 21 Seniors were destroyed, 18 of them the classic wooden Seniors.

As of 2015, two boat yards were still building Wianno Seniors. Crosby Yacht Yard, Inc. in Osterville, Massachusetts, and E M Crosby Boatworks in West Barnstable. Hull number 219 was to be launched in 2015 by E M Crosby Boatworks. Several hull numbers were omitted in the sequence.

== Today ==
Many Wianno Seniors still exist, typically seaworthy. The boat is raced on Nantucket Sound by four Cape Cod yacht clubs: Bass River Yacht Club, Hyannis Yacht Club, Hyannis Port Yacht Club, and Wianno Yacht Club.
