= List of shipwrecks in August 1841 =

The list of shipwrecks in August 1841 includes ships sunk, foundered, wrecked, grounded, or otherwise lost during August 1841.

== 1 August ==
List of shipwrecks: 1 August 1841
Ship	State	Description
Fama	United Kingdom	The ship was driven ashore at Great Yarmouth, Norfolk. She was on a voyage from Selby, Yorkshire to London. She was refloated and resumed her voyage.
Margaret	(United Kingdom of Great Britain and Ireland) British North America	The brig was damaged by fire at London.
Sorceress	United Kingdom	The barque was wrecked on the Carcades Caragus Shoals. Her crew were rescued. She was on a voyage from Mauritius to Calcutta, India.

== 2 August ==
List of shipwrecks: 2 August 1841
Ship	State	Description
Atlas	United Kingdom	The ship was wrecked at the mouth of the Narva River. She was on a voyage from Glasgow, Renfrewshire to Saint Petersburg, Russia.
Fama	United Kingdom	The ship was driven ashore at Great Yarmouth, Norfolk. She was on a voyage from Selby, Yorkshire to London. Fama was refloated and resumed her voyage.
Princess Royal	United Kingdom	The ship was driven ashore at Cap Granitola, Sicily. She was refloated on 18 August and taken into Marsala, Sicily.

== 3 August ==
List of shipwrecks: 3 August 1841
Ship	State	Description
Ajax	United Kingdom	The barque was wrecked off "Levenskar". Her crew were rescued.
Inverness Packet	United Kingdom	The ship was wrecked at Redcar, Yorkshire. She was on a voyage from Stockton-on-Tees, County Durham to Rochester, Kent.
Princesse Josephine	Norway	The ship was driven ashore at Portsmouth, Hampshire, United Kingdom. She was on a voyage from Portsmouth to Christiania.
Walmer	United Kingdom	The whaler was wrecked at "Bouro". Her crew were rescued. She was on a voyage from the South Seas to London.

== 4 August ==
List of shipwrecks: 4 August 1841
Ship	State	Description
Dapper	United Kingdom	The ship was driven ashore and wrecked at Staithes, Yorkshire. Her crew were rescued.
David	(United Kingdom of Great Britain and Ireland) Van Diemen's Land	The whaler, a brig, was wrecked in the Cook Strait with the loss of four of her crew.
Emerald	United Kingdom	The ship foundered off Livorno, Grand Duchy of Tuscany. She was on a voyage from Livorno to Liverpool, Lancashire. Emerald was refloated on 6 August and taken into Livorno.
Triumph	United Kingdom	The brig was wrecked on Johnson's Reef, in the West Indies.

== 6 August ==
List of shipwrecks: 6 August 1841
Ship	State	Description
Harmony	United Kingdom	The ship was driven ashore in the Traverse. She was on a voyage from Quebec City, Province of Canada to Hull, Yorkshire.
Harrison	United Kingdom	The ship was driven ashore and damaged at Scotstown Head, Aberdeenshire. She was on a voyage from Sunderland, County Durham to Quebec City. She was refloated on 18 August and taken into Peterhead, Aberdeenshire.
Hoppett	France	The ship ran aground on the English Bank, off the coast of Argentina. She was on a voyage from Cette, Hérault to Montevideo, Uruguay.

== 7 August ==
List of shipwrecks: 7 August 1841
Ship	State	Description
Ann	United Kingdom	The ship was run down and sunk in the Sloyne. Her crew were rescued.
Josephine	Hamburg	The ship ran aground off Paterholm, in the Kalmar Strait and was wrecked. She was on a voyage from Hamburg to Copenhagen, Denmark.
Mary Ann	United Kingdom	The ship was driven ashore near "Clonea". She was on a voyage from Saint John, New Brunswick, British North America to Dungarvan, County Antrim. She was refloated the next day.
Splendid	United Kingdom	The ship was wrecked on the Calipash Key, off the coast of Cuba. All on board were rescued.
Undaunted	United Kingdom	The barque was wrecked on Sable Island, Nova Scotia, British North America. Her fifteen crew were rescued. She was on a voyage from New York, United States to Quebec, Province of Canada.

== 8 August ==
List of shipwrecks: 8 August 1841
Ship	State	Description
Goeland	France	The ship departed from Tampico, Mexico for Bordeaux, Gironde. No further trace, presumed foundered with the loss of all hands.

== 9 August ==
List of shipwrecks: 9 August 1841
Ship	State	Description
Erie	United States	The paddle steamer was destroyed by fire in Lake Erie 8 nautical miles (15 km) off Silver Creek, New York with the loss of 175 lives. Twenty-nine survivors were rescued by the steamships Clinton and Lady (both United States). Erie was taken in tow but consequently sank.
Euphemia	United Kingdom	The ship was driven ashore and wrecked near Peniche, Portugal. Her crew were rescued. She was on a voyage from Newcastle upon Tyne, Northumberland to Lisbon, Portugal.
Jane	United Kingdom	The ship ran aground in the River Blackwater at Maldon, Essex. She was on a voyage from South Shields, County Durham to Maldon.
Mathesis	United Kingdom	The ship was damaged by fire in the Atlantic Ocean. She was on a voyage from London to Sydney, New South Wales. Mathesis put into Rio de Janeiro, Brazil for repairs. She arrived on 25 August.
Splendid	United Kingdom	The ship was wrecked on the Isle of Pines, Cuba. Her crew were rescued. She was on a voyage from Jamaica to Liverpool, Lancashire.
Vibelia	United Kingdom	The ship was wrecked in the Mayotte Islands. Her twenty crew were rescued by Uranie (French Navy). Vibelia was on a voyage from Newcastle upon Tyne to Aden.

== 10 August ==
List of shipwrecks: 10 August 1841
Ship	State	Description
Hoffnung	Hamburg	The ship was wrecked on the Drogue, at the mouth of the Eider. She was on a voyage from Altona to Flensburg, Duchy of Holstein.
Portland	United Kingdom	The ship was in collision with Tug and was consequently beached at Newport, Monmouthshire.

== 11 August ==
List of shipwrecks: 11 August 1841
Ship	State	Description
Cuba	United States	The ship was driven ashore on Inagua, Bahamas. Her crew were rescued. She was on a voyage from Philadelphia, Pennsylvania to Jamaica.
Elizabeth	United Kingdom	The sloop foundered in the Irish Sea off the coast of Pembrokeshire with the loss of all hands.
Thomas and Mary	United Kingdom	The ship foundered in the Bristol Channel. Her crew were rescued.

== 12 August ==
List of shipwrecks: 12 August 1841
Ship	State	Description
Bonne Aimee	France	The ship was wrecked on Inagua, Bahamas. Her crew were rescued. She was on a voyage from Gonaïves, Haiti to Havre de Grâce, Seine-Inférieure.
Curtis	United States	The brig was driven ashore on the coast of Zeeland, Netherlands.
Frederick Wilhelm IV	Prussia	The ship struck a rock and was beached. She was on a voyage from Tiltip to Memel.
Gotthalfe	Prussia	The ship ran aground off Helsingør, Denmark. She was on a voyage from Memel to Havre de Grâce, Seine-Inférieure, France. Gotthalfe was refloated the next day.

== 13 August ==
List of shipwrecks: 13 August 1841
Ship	State	Description
Alsen	Norway	The ship was in collision with Vernon and foundered in the English Channel off Dungeness, Kent, United Kingdom. Her crew were rescued. She was on a voyage from Nantes, Loire-Inférieure, France to Christiansand.
Eilcke	Netherlands	The ship was wrecked near Süderoog, Duchy of Holstein.
George	United Kingdom	The ship ran aground and was damaged at Aberystwyth, Cardiganshire. She was later refloated.
Marmora	United Kingdom	The ship was wrecked on Cape Sable Island, Nova Scotia, British North America. Her crew were rescued. She was on a voyage from Liverpool, Lancashire to Richmond, Virginia, United States.
Sveridge Herman	Sweden	The ship ran aground off Kåseborga and was wrecked. She was on a voyage from Oulu, Grand Duchy of Finland to Lübeck.

== 14 August ==
List of shipwrecks: 14 August 1841
Ship	State	Description
William	United Kingdom	The ship ran aground on the Nore. She was on a voyage from Sunderland, County Durham to London. William was refloated the next day and resumed her voyage.

== 15 August ==
List of shipwrecks: 15 August 1841
Ship	State	Description
Henry Woolley	United Kingdom	The ship was driven ashore 30 nautical miles (56 km) from Key West, Florida Territory. She was on a voyage from Jamaica to London. Henry Woolley was later refloated.
Paget	United Kingdom	The brig was wrecked at Anegada, Virgin Islands. Her crew were rescued by the steamship Firefly (United Kingdom). Paget was on a voyage from Saint Vincent, Virgin Islands to Saint John, New Brunswick, British North America.

== 16 August ==
List of shipwrecks: 16 August 1841
Ship	State	Description
David	(United Kingdom of Great Britain and Ireland) Van Diemen's Land	The whaler was wrecked on the coast of New Zealand.
Sarah	(United Kingdom of Great Britain and Ireland) British North America	The ship was wrecked near Cape St. Francis, Newfoundland. Her crew were rescued. She was on a voyage from Harbour Grace to Sydney, Nova Scotia.

== 18 August ==
List of shipwrecks: 18 August 1841
Ship	State	Description
Alexander	United Kingdom	The ship was run aground off Amrum, Duchy of Schleswig. She was refloated and beached on Föhr. Alexander was on a voyage from Newcastle upon Tyne, Northumberland to Hamburg. She was patched up and resumed her voyage.
Samuel	United Kingdom	The ship capsized on the Red Sands. She was on a voyage from Quebec City, Province of Canada, British North America to Carlisle, Cumberland. Samuel was refloated the next day and taken into Port Carlisle, Cumberland.

== 19 August ==
List of shipwrecks: 19 August 1841
Ship	State	Description
Dumbarton	United Kingdom	The ship was in collision with Albert (United Kingdom) and sank in the Firth of Forth. Her five crew and the ship's dog were rescued by Albert. Dumbarton was on a voyage from Leith, Lothian to Alloa, Clackmannanshire.
Iris	United Kingdom	The ship was wrecked between Land's End and Cape Cornwall. Her crew were rescued. She was on a voyage from Dartmouth, Devon to Neath, Glamorgan.

== 20 August ==
List of shipwrecks: 20 August 1841
Ship	State	Description
Ant	United Kingdom	The ship was severely damaged by fire off Dale, Pembrokeshire.
Diligence	United Kingdom	The ship was run into by Westchester (United States) in the River Mersey. She capsized and sank. She was on a voyage from Liverpool, Lancashire to Caernarfon.
Emanuel	United Kingdom	The ship ran aground off Skanör, Sweden. She was on a voyage from Danzig to London. Emanuel was refloated and taken into [Helsingør], Denmark.
Francis Jeffery	United Kingdom	The ship ran aground on the Stonebottoms, off the coast of Denmark. She was on a voyage from Aberdeen to a Baltic port. She was refloated on 24 August and resumed her voyage.
Wohlfahrt	Duchy of Holstein	The ship was in collision with another vessel and foundered in the Kattegat. Her crew were rescued. She was on a voyage from Flensburg to Harwich, Essex, United Kingdom.

== 21 August ==
List of shipwrecks: 21 August 1841
Ship	State	Description
Mary Bain	United Kingdom	The ship was driven ashore at Sandhammaren, Sweden. She was on a voyage from Danzig to London. Mary Bain was refloated on 28 August.
Perseverance	France	The ship was wrecked on Castle Island, Bermuda. She was on a voyage from St. Jago de Cuba, Cuba to Marseille, Bouches-du-Rhône.
St. Mary	United Kingdom	The barque was wrecked on the Pentland Skerries. She was on a voyage from Hull, Yorkshire to Quebec City, Province of Canada, British North America.
Speculator	(United Kingdom of Great Britain and Ireland) New South Wales	The brig was driven on shore on the south coast of Banks Peninsula, New Zealand with the loss of two of her crew. Six men belonging to a shore party drowned while attempting to rescue the crew of the Speculator and Transfer (qv), which was driven on shore during the same storm.
Transfer	(United Kingdom of Great Britain and Ireland) New South Wales	The brig was driven on shore on the south coast of Banks Peninsula, New Zealand. All the crew were saved, but six members of a shore party drowned whilst attempting to save the crew of the Transfer and Speculator (qv), which was driven on shore during the same storm.

== 22 August ==
List of shipwrecks: 22 August 1841
Ship	State	Description
Integrity	United Kingdom	The ship was lost in the Torres Strait. Her crew were rescued by John Knox and Thomas Crisp (both United Kingdom).
Malcolm	United Kingdom	The ship foundered in the Irish Sea off Lytham St. Annes, Lancashire. Her crew were rescued. She was on a voyage from Liverpool, Lancashire to Glasgow, Renfrewshire.
Solide	Sweden	The ship capsized in a thunderstorm at Gothenburg.

== 23 August ==
List of shipwrecks: 23 August 1841
Ship	State	Description
St. Pierre	United Kingdom	The ship foundered in the North Sea off "Doulington". Her crew were rescued. She was on a voyage from Dunkirk, Nord to Hull, Yorkshire, United Kingdom.

== 24 August ==
List of shipwrecks: 24 August 1841
Ship	State	Description
Belle Annette	France	The ship departed from Nantes, Loire-Inférieure for London, United Kingdom. No further trace, presumed foundered with the loss of all hands.
London	United Kingdom	The ship was wrecked on Grand Island, Massachusetts, United States. She was on a voyage from Liverpool, Lancashire to Jamaica.

== 25 August ==
List of shipwrecks: 25 August 1841
Ship	State	Description
Hardy	United Kingdom	The steamship was holed by an anchor and sank in the River Thames at Wapping, Middlesex. She was refloated on 30 August but found to be severely damaged.
Mary Anne	United States	The ship foundered in the Mediterranean Sea off Sardinia. Eleven crew were rescued by the brig Rover (United Kingdom).
Solway	United Kingdom	The steamship ran aground on the Barnhourie Sandbankm in the Solway Firth. She was refloated and consequently beached at Southerness, Wigtownshire. All on board, more than 320 people, were rescued.
William Hinch	United Kingdom	The ship was driven ashore between Mizen Head and Sheep's Head, County Cork. She was refloated on 27 August and taken into Crookhaven, County Cork.

== 26 August ==
List of shipwrecks: 26 August 1841
Ship	State	Description
Theodore Korner	United States	The ship was driven ashore 30 nautical miles (56 km) north of Fort Lauderdale, Florida Territory. She was on a voyage from New Orleans, Louisiana to Cowes, Isle of Wight, United Kingdom. She was later refloated and taken into Key West, Florida Territory.
Traveller	United Kingdom	The ship was lost near Egersund, Norway. She was on a voyage from Liverpool, Lancashire to Kiel, Prussia.

== 28 August ==
List of shipwrecks: 28 August 1841
Ship	State	Description
Diana	United Kingdom	The ship ran aground on the Lucipara Shoal. She was on a voyage from Singapore to London. She was refloated on 30 August and resumed her voyage.
Francis Jeffrey	United Kingdom	The ship ran aground in the Swine Bottoms, off the coast of Denmark. She was on a voyage from Aberdeen to a Baltic port.

== 29 August ==
List of shipwrecks: 29 August 1841
Ship	State	Description
Active	United Kingdom	The sloop sprang a leak and sank off Handa, Caithness. Her crew were rescued. She was on a voyage from South Uist, Outer Hebrides to Thurso, Caithness.

== 30 August ==
List of shipwrecks: 30 August 1841
Ship	State	Description
Frederica Amalia	Stettin	The ship ran aground on the Burbo Bank, in Liverpool Bay. She was on a voyage from Liverpool, Lancashire, United Kingdom to Stettin. She was refloated and resumed her voyage.
Mary Alice	United Kingdom	The ship ran aground on the Burbo Bank. She was on a voyage from Liverpool to Pärnu, Russia. She was refloated and resumed her voyage.

== 31 August ==
List of shipwrecks: 31 August 1841
Ship	State	Description
Active	United Kingdom	The ship sprang a leak and foundered off Handa, Sutherland. She was on a voyage from South Uist Outer Hebrides to Newcastle upon Tyne, Northumberland.

== Unknown date ==
List of shipwrecks: Unknown date in August 1841
Ship	State	Description
Argo	United Kingdom	The ship was driven ashore and damaged near Bawdsey, Suffolk. She was refloated on 13 August and taken into Harwich, Essex.
Canadian	United Kingdom	The ship was driven ashore at Bude, Cornwall. She was refloated on 19 August.
Dolphin	(United Kingdom of Great Britain and Ireland) Sierra Leone	The schooner was wrecked on Green Island, in the Rio Nuñez.
Intrupendte Ungaro	Kingdom of Lombardy–Venetia	The polacca brig was abandoned in the Adriatic Sea on or before 6 August.
Jeune Marie Charlotte	France	The ship was driven ashore and wrecked at Whitby, Yorkshire, United Kingdom before 13 August.
Laing	United Kingdom	The ship was driven ashore in the Dardanelles. She had been refloated by 17 August.
Lord Canterbury	United Kingdom	The ship was driven ashore at Round Point. she was on a voyage from Quebec City, Province of Canada, British North America to Bristol, Gloucestershire. Lord Canterbury was refloated on 16 August and taken into Bristol.
Marin	France	The ship was driven ashore near Kuressaare, Russia. She was on a voyage from Bordeaux, Gironde to Saint Petersburg, Russia. Marin was refloated on 3 September and taken into Kuressaare.
Oberlin	Russian Empire	The ship ran aground on the Anholt Reef, in the Kattegat. She was on refloated and subsequently put into South Shields, County Durham, United Kingdom, where she arrived on 21 August.
Overyssel	Netherlands	The ship foundered in the Strait of Bali before 3 August.
Paragon	United Kingdom	The ship was driven ashore in the Hooghly River before 7 August. She was on a voyage from London to Calcutta, India. Paragon was refloated on 8 August and completed her voyage.
Perseverant	France	The ship was wrecked on Castle Island. Her crew were rescued. She was on a voyage from St. Jago de Cuba, Cuba to a French port.
Sir F. B. Head	United Kingdom	The ship was driven ashore in the River Avon. She was refloated on 13 August and taken into the King Road.
Sisters	United Kingdom	The trow foundered in the Bristol Channel between Flat Holm and Steep Holm with the loss of four of the nine people on board. She was on a voyage from Bridgwater, Somerset to Bristol, Gloucestershire.
