= Wianno Club =

- U.S. National Register of Historic Places
- U.S. Historic district – Contributing property
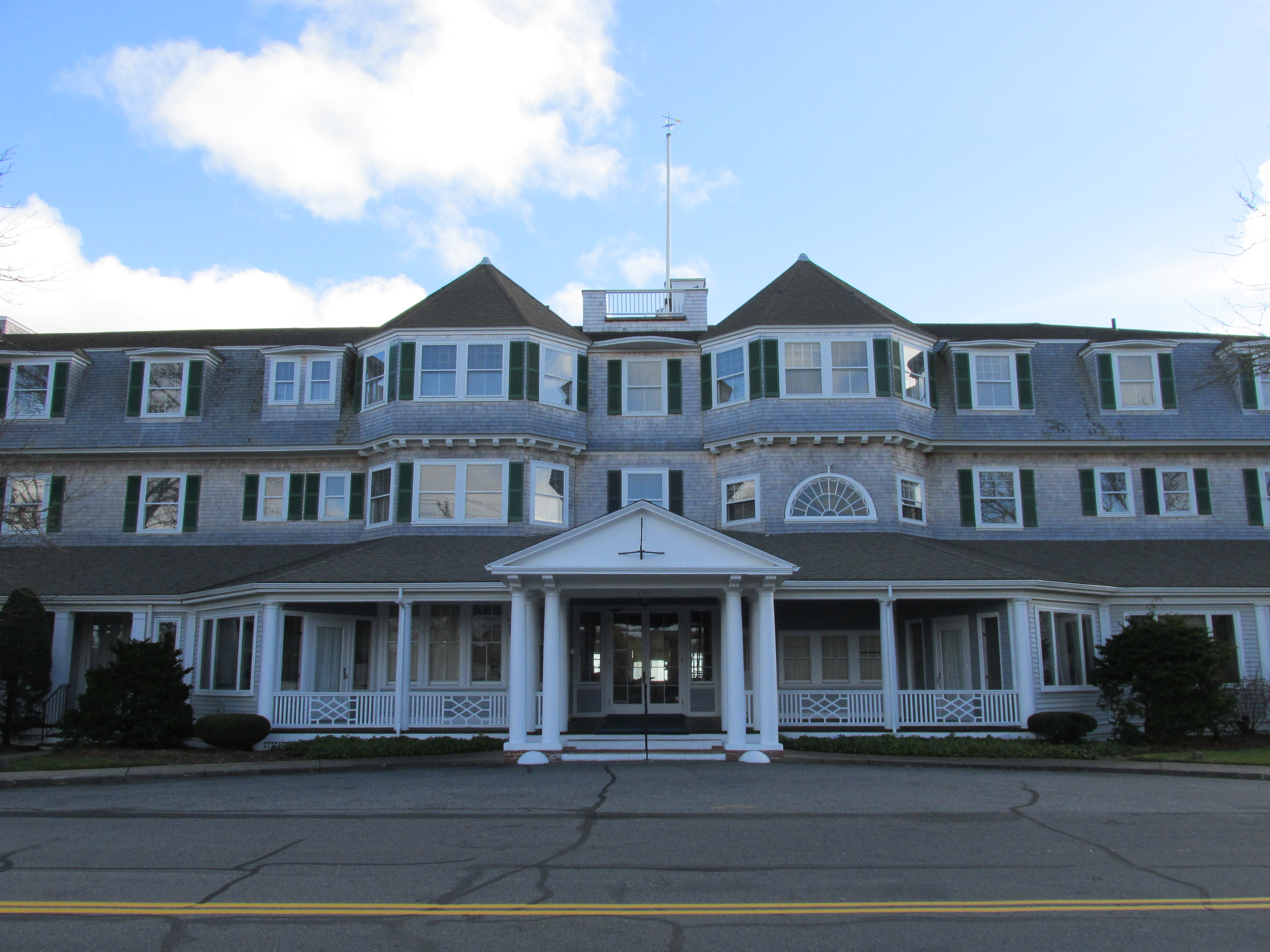
- Wianno Club

- Location within Cape Cod Location within Massachusetts Location within the United States
- Location: Osterville, Massachusetts
- Coordinates: 41°36′58″N 70°22′17″W
- Built: 1887
- Architectural style: Shingle Style
- Part of: Wianno Historic District (ID87000316)
- NRHP reference No.: 79000325

Significant dates
- Added to NRHP: March 2, 1979
- Designated CP: November 10, 1987

The Wianno Club is a historic club at 107 Sea View Avenue in Osterville, Massachusetts. The club began as the Cotocheset House, a Shingle-style structure built in 1882 on the site of a grander hotel that burned down in 1881. This hotel was the centerpiece of a major resort development for the wealthy that was mostly developed prior to World War I. In 1916 the newly founded club purchased the hotel property. The club built a nine-hole golf course on the original land purchase now occupied by holes numbered 13-18. The 16th was the first hole, and the Swan residence behind the hole was built as the original clubhouse. Additional land was assembled on the west side of Parker Road and north of West Bay Road and in 1919, Donald Ross was hired to redesign the original nine and to create a new nine.

The Wianno Club is a nonprofit under section 501(c)(7) of the Internal Revenue Code; in 2024 it had total revenue of $11,577,309 and total assets of $24,245,955.

The main clubhouse was listed on the National Register of Historic Places in 1979, as one of a very few surviving 19th-century hotel buildings, and is the centerpiece of the Wianno Historic District. It is a large three-story Shingle style building, with a variety of cross gables, projecting sections and porches typical of the style. A single-story wing was added to the northeast after the club took the building over, and a Colonial Revival porch was added in the 1920s. Its interiors contain much original detail. The club has also taken over the neighboring Tiffany Cottage as a guest house. Former Chief Justice of the United States Charles Evans Hughes died there in 1948.

== See also ==
- National Register of Historic Places listings in Barnstable County, Massachusetts
