= Osterville, Massachusetts =

- Village
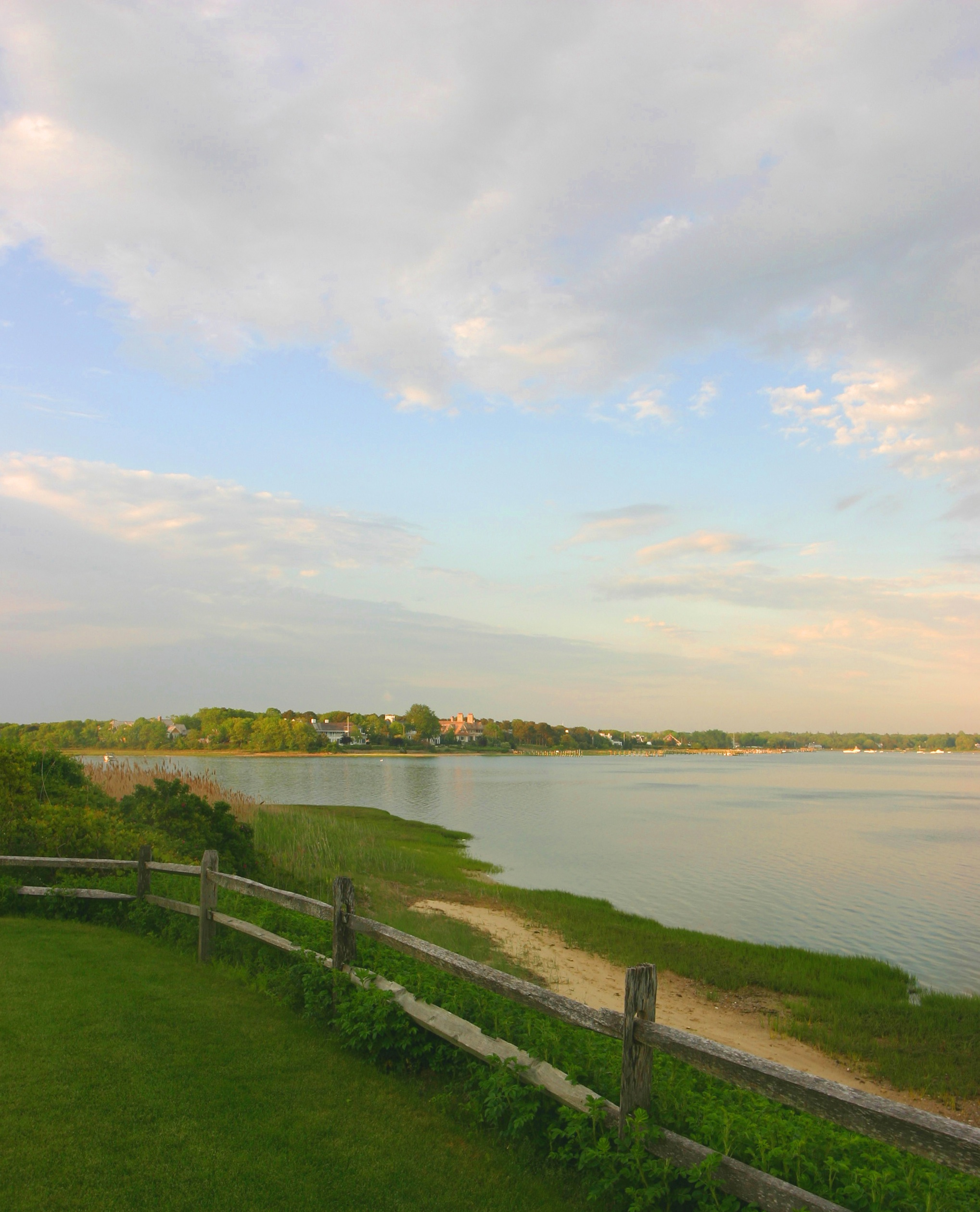
- View from Oyster Harbors

- Location of ZIP code 02655 Osterville within the Town of Barnstable, county, and state
- Coordinates: 41°37′42″N 70°23′13″W
- Country: United States
- State: Massachusetts
- County: Barnstable
- Town: Barnstable

Area
  - Total: 8.29 sq mi (21.47 km^{2})
  - Land: 6.53 sq mi (16.91 km^{2})
  - Water: 1.76 sq mi (4.56 km^{2})

Population (2020)
  - Total: 3,591
  - Density: 550/sq mi (212.4/km^{2})
- Time zone: UTC-5 (Eastern (EST))
  - Summer (DST): UTC-4 (EDT)

Osterville is one of seven villages within the town of Barnstable, Massachusetts, United States. The village of Osterville is located on the south side of Barnstable on Nantucket Sound. Osterville is a residential community that includes marshes, bays, ponds, a small lake, beaches, and a small business district. Notably, the village is home to the Crosby Yacht Yard; the Crosbys are America's oldest active wooden boat-building family.

== History ==
Osterville was originally named Cotacheset, based on the Native American name for the area. Over time it became a center for "oystering" (harvesting wild oysters) and was renamed Oysterville. Later a map misspelled the name as Osterville and the village became so.

The following is from the memoirs of Sarah Hallet Boult, Osterville, MA, age 93, as of March 1, 1955:

Membership in the Osterville Historical Society is not limited but village-wide and open to all who are making history today, steadily swarming over the pleasant acres that “Paupinanack sold for a copper kettle and some fencing done.” How many years ago? About 1648. The range of “Cotacheset” was along East Bay and the Centerville River, and when a man said he was going down to Kocochoice, he meant where Crosby’s boat shop is now, along West Bay. The part of the David Estate that adjoins Marstons Mills was known as Mystic. The Shawme Indians being neighbors to Roger Goodspeed who was the first to venture into this territory. The Historical Society all began when a small group of three people recalling old tales of older generations. Promptly the group increased and interest as well, in back tracking to the very first, few that planted another firm foothold on Cape Cod sand.

== About ==
Osterville's business district includes a public library, gift stores, women's fashions, restaurants, a small market, banks with ATMs, a pizza place, package store (spirits), a U.S. Post Office, a hardware store, art galleries, barber and beauty shops, and real estate brokers.

During July and August, Osterville's population swells due to seasonal residents. Many summer residents maintain a second house in Osterville while residing most of the year in the Greater Boston area. The village is known for its oceanfront estates.

The cemetery for the village of Osterville is the Hillside Cemetery on Old Mill Road.

The Osterville Historical Museum, established in 1931, preserves the history of Osterville for all of those who love her, past, present, and future. The museum includes the largest collection of wooden boats in Massachusetts. The Cammett House, the oldest house in Osterville, and the Captain Jonathan Parker House, owned by a 1820s coastal schooner captain, are also located on the museum campus. A series of boat shops includes the 1850 original Herbert F. Crosby boat shop. Every Friday mid-June to mid-September, the museum hosts the Osterville Farmers' Market.

Armstrong-Kelley Park, the oldest and largest privately owned park on Cape Cod, is located in Osterville. Crosby Yacht Yard is port to the Crosby catboat, and the Wianno senior, the latter a favorite of President John F. Kennedy, a resident of nearby Hyannis Port.

A steel drawbridge connects the village to Little Island and Grand Island (also known as Oyster Harbors), a gated community featuring many luxury houses and a private country club. The neighborhood of Wianno abuts the East Bay section of Osterville.

There are two private country clubs in Osterville: the Wianno Club and the Oyster Harbors Club. Each club has a private 18-hole golf course, private tennis facilities, and a private beach. The Wianno Yacht Club, a private club on West Bay, offers children's sailing lessons.

Dowses Beach in Osterville is a Barnstable town beach; there are toilet facilities with showers and a beach house for changing in privacy. Lifeguards are present during the summer months only.

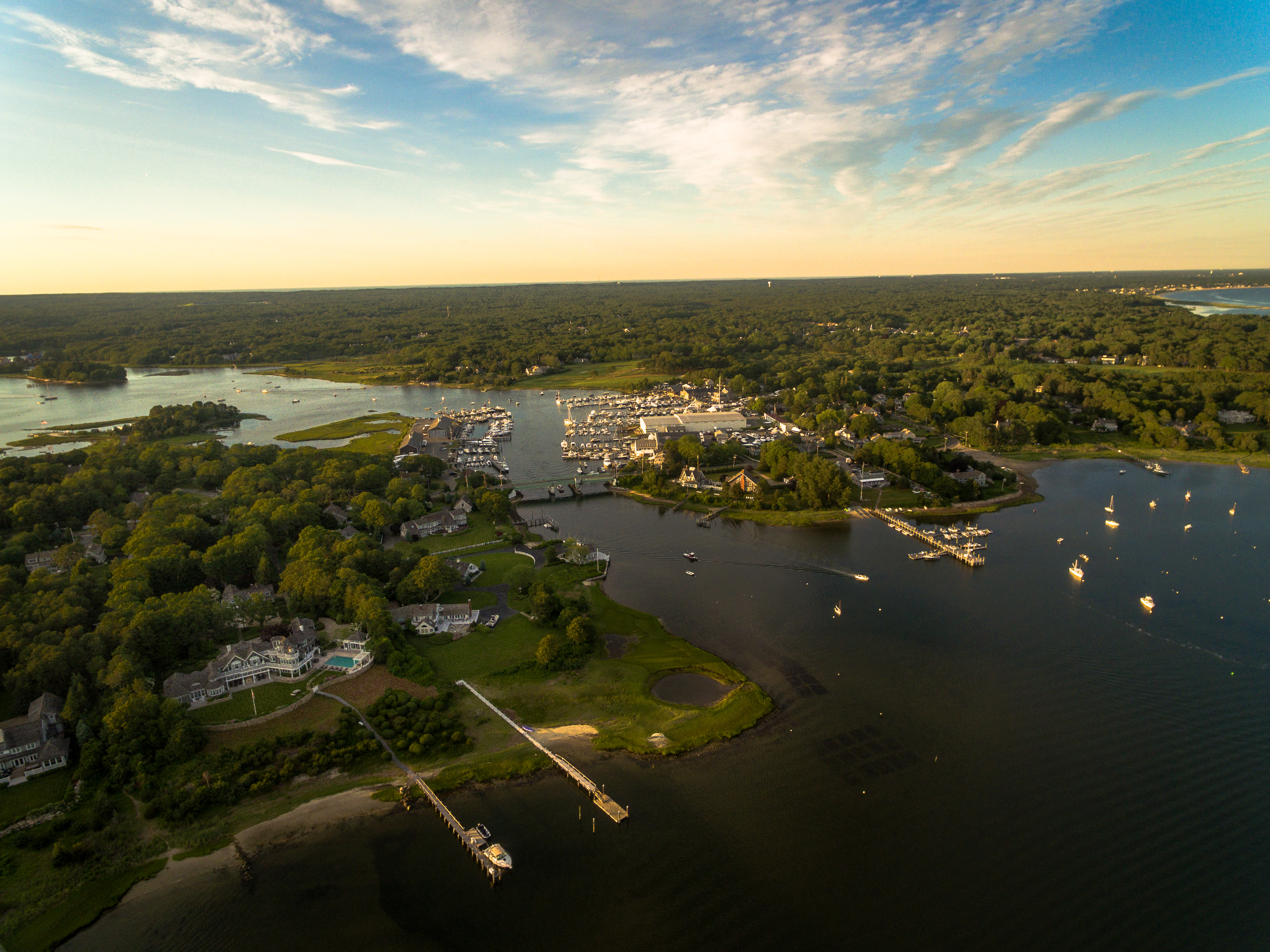
West Bay/ Osterville Drawbridge

== Education ==
Osterville is home to a private K-12 school, Cape Cod Academy.

== Notable people ==
- Charles Bilezikian, businessman, co-founder of Christmas Tree Shops
- Jack Birmingham, former NASCAR Winston Cup Series owner from 1999 to 2001.
- James M. Gavin, World War II general, US ambassador to France.
- Andy Hallett, actor and singer who appeared on the WB's Angel (1999 TV series).
- David Hartman, the first host of ABC's Good Morning America.
- Charles Evans Hughes, 11th Chief Justice of the United States.
- Adam Oates, Hall of Fame National Hockey League player and former Washington Capitals coach.
- Gene Rayburn, host of the popular 1970s game show The Match Game.
- Lee Remick, actress
- Henry Austin Scudder, state politician and associate judge of the Superior Court of Massachusetts
- Richard B. Sellars, Chairman and CEO of Johnson & Johnson.
- John Thomas Underwood, founder of the Underwood Typewriter Company, lived in "Blink Bonnie" in Wianno
- Bob Vila, former host of This Old House.
- Kurt Vonnegut, 20th-century American writer.
- Joe Cronin, former Boston Red Sox player/manager.
