= Christmas Tree Shops =

American chain of specialty retail stores

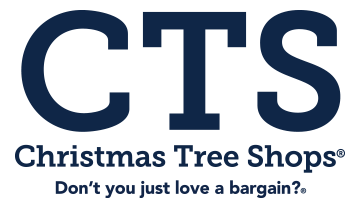

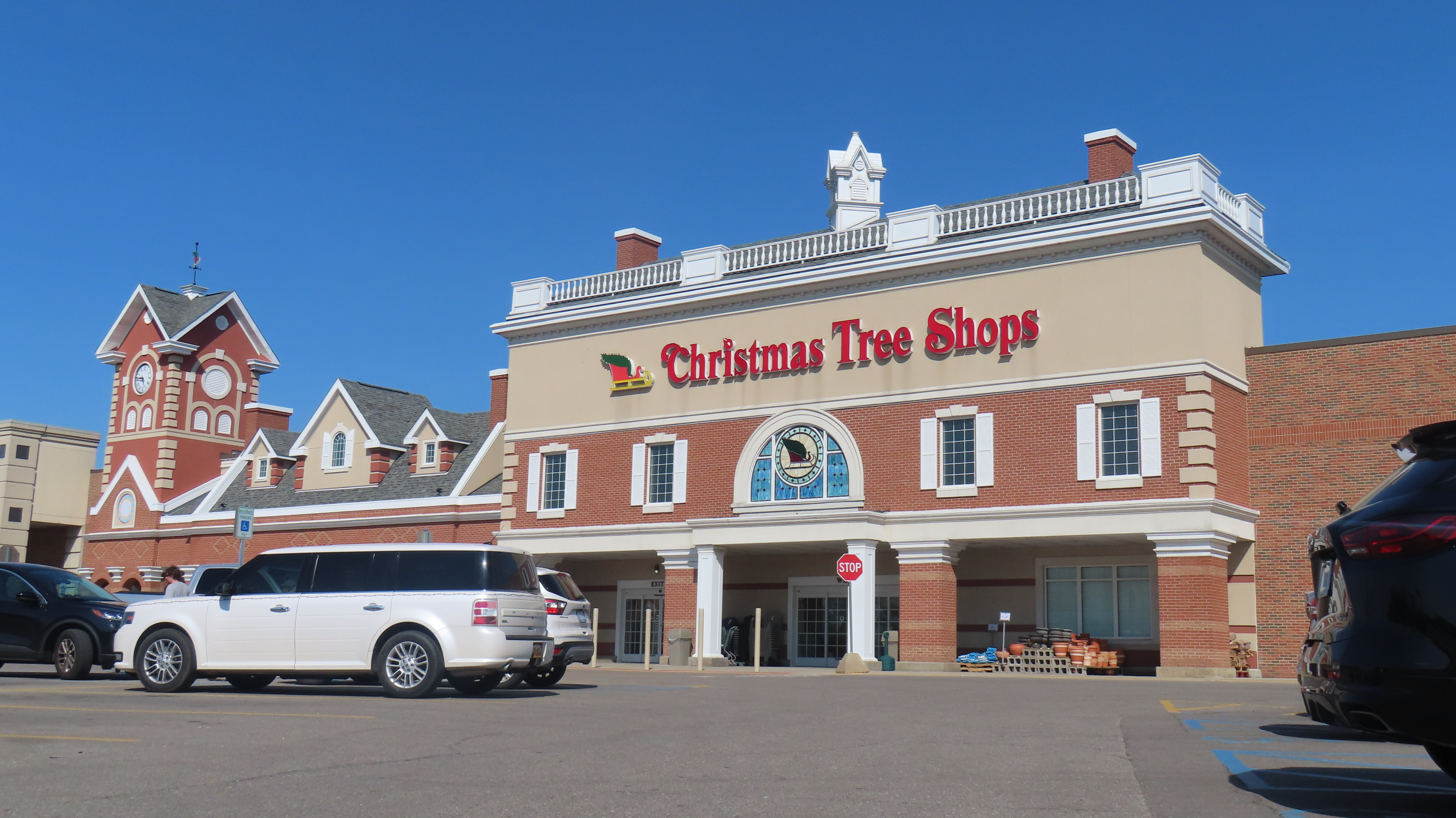
- Christmas Tree Shops store in Taylor, Michigan
- Type: Private
- Industry: Retail
- Founded: September 15, 1970; 56 years ago in Yarmouth Port, Massachusetts, U.S.
- Founder: Charles Bilezikian; Doreen Bilezikian
- Defunct: 2023
- Fate: Chapter 7 bankruptcy, liquidation
- Headquarters: MA, Middleborough, Massachusetts, U.S.
- Area served: New England, Mid Atlantic, Midwest, Southeast
- Products: Housewares, home decor, toys
- Services: Home decor
- Parent: Bed Bath & Beyond (2003–2020); Handil Holdings LLC (2020–2021)

Christmas Tree Shops (also known as Christmas Tree Shops andThat!, or simply andThat!) was an American chain of big-box specialty retail stores, headquartered in Middleborough, Massachusetts. At its peak, the chain operated 72 stores in 20 U.S. states, primarily in the Northeast. The company filed for bankruptcy in 2023 and closed all of its stores by August 12, 2023, officially ending its 53-year legacy.

== History ==
=== Early years ===
In 1970, Charles Bilezikian and his wife Doreen opened the first Christmas Tree Shops in Yarmouth Port, Massachusetts, on Cape Cod. The original location comprised three separate buildings: the Front Shop, the Back Shop and the Barn Shop (which mostly sold penny candy), hence the pluralization of the store's name. The first complex, which the Bilezikians lived above, was on Route 6A, and it was open seasonally in the spring through early fall. Beginning in the 1980s, the chain began expanding beyond Cape Cod, growing to reach eight stores by 1984. That year, the company purchased the Cape Cod Coliseum and converted it to a warehouse. The chain then entered Connecticut with a store in Manchester in September 1993. In the mid-1990s, Christmas Tree Shops introduced a series of commercials in which the chain's customers were recorded showcasing items they purchased, paired with the soon-to-be famous jingle, "Don't you just love a bargain?". This campaign lasted well into the 2000s.

=== Bed Bath & Beyond era ===
The chain was acquired by Bed Bath & Beyond in 2003, though the Bilezikians remained involved in its executive operations. Under Bed Bath & Beyond, the chain began to expand beyond New England, arriving in Bed Bath & Beyond's native New Jersey, followed by Delaware and Pennsylvania. The chain entered the Midwest, with stores in Michigan and Ohio. The original stores on Route 6A were closed in January 2007, though the site is now occupied by stores owned by the Bilezikians' son Greg. Some of the earlier Cape Cod stores, as in West Dennis, were dwarfed by newer built stores.

==== andThat! ====
In 2013, Christmas Tree Shops introduced a new brand and store format called Christmas Tree Shops andThat!, with the name change intended to avoid confusion in new markets unfamiliar with the store. By 2016, the name was shortened to simply "andThat!" for all new stores opened under Bed Bath & Beyond.

=== Handil era ===
In November 2020, Bed Bath & Beyond sold Christmas Tree Shops and its Middleborough, Massachusetts distribution center to Handil Holdings, a private company, for an undisclosed amount. A year later, in November 2021, the company opened nineteen pop-up holiday-themed stores across the United States; these remained open through January 3, 2022.

=== Bankruptcy and liquidation ===
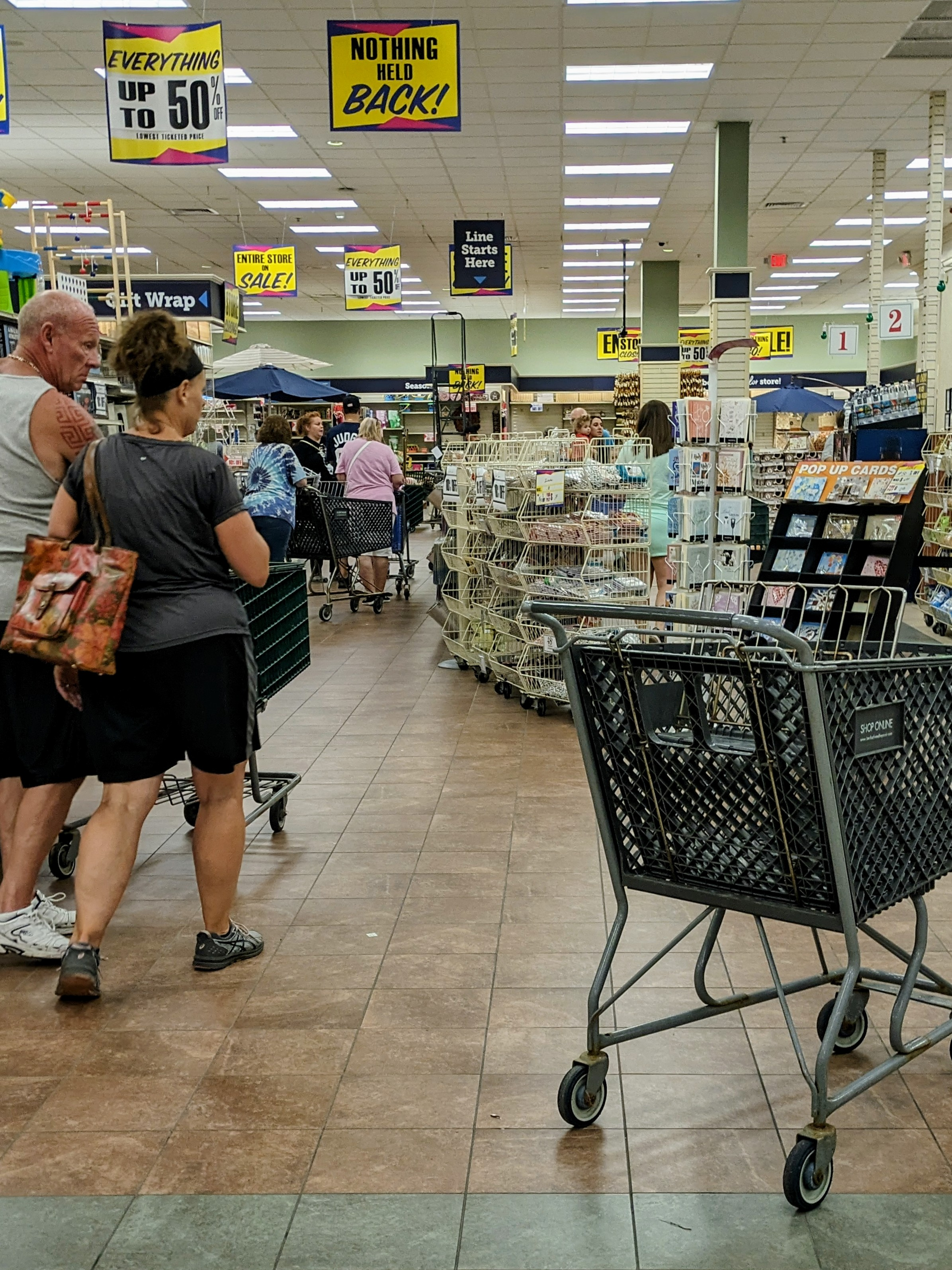
Christmas Tree Shop closing in Taylor, Michigan

On May 4, 2023, following the collapse of its former parent company, Bed Bath & Beyond, Christmas Tree Shops announced that it was preparing to file for Chapter 11 bankruptcy protection; the chain and its parent company, Handil Holdings, filed for Chapter 11 bankruptcy the next day, May 5. Ten underperforming stores were closed following the filing, in hopes of allowing the company to restructure operations and emerge from bankruptcy by August. However, after the company defaulted on a loan used for its restructuring, it was eventually announced that unless a buyer could be found for the chain by July 5, the chain would liquidate and close all remaining stores. With no buyer found, liquidation sales began at all stores nationwide on July 7, with gift cards and coupons being honored through July 21. During liquidation, multiple websites and Facebook accounts impersonated the chain (which did not sell online), prompting the company to publicly disavow any online retailer using its name. The chain was also widely accused of falsely inflating regular prices before clearance discounts were applied. The last stores closed permanently on August 12, 2023. Four days later, the chain's bankruptcy case was formally converted to Chapter 7, as proceeds from liquidation sales fell short of targets. Many employees accused the company of failing to pay bonuses promised for work during liquidation sales; the judge presiding over the Chapter 7 case later ordered Hilco, the liquidator, to issue the promised paychecks. As a result of the liquidation, a planned new store in Bohemia, New York, which was slated for a summer 2023 opening, never opened.

== Stores ==
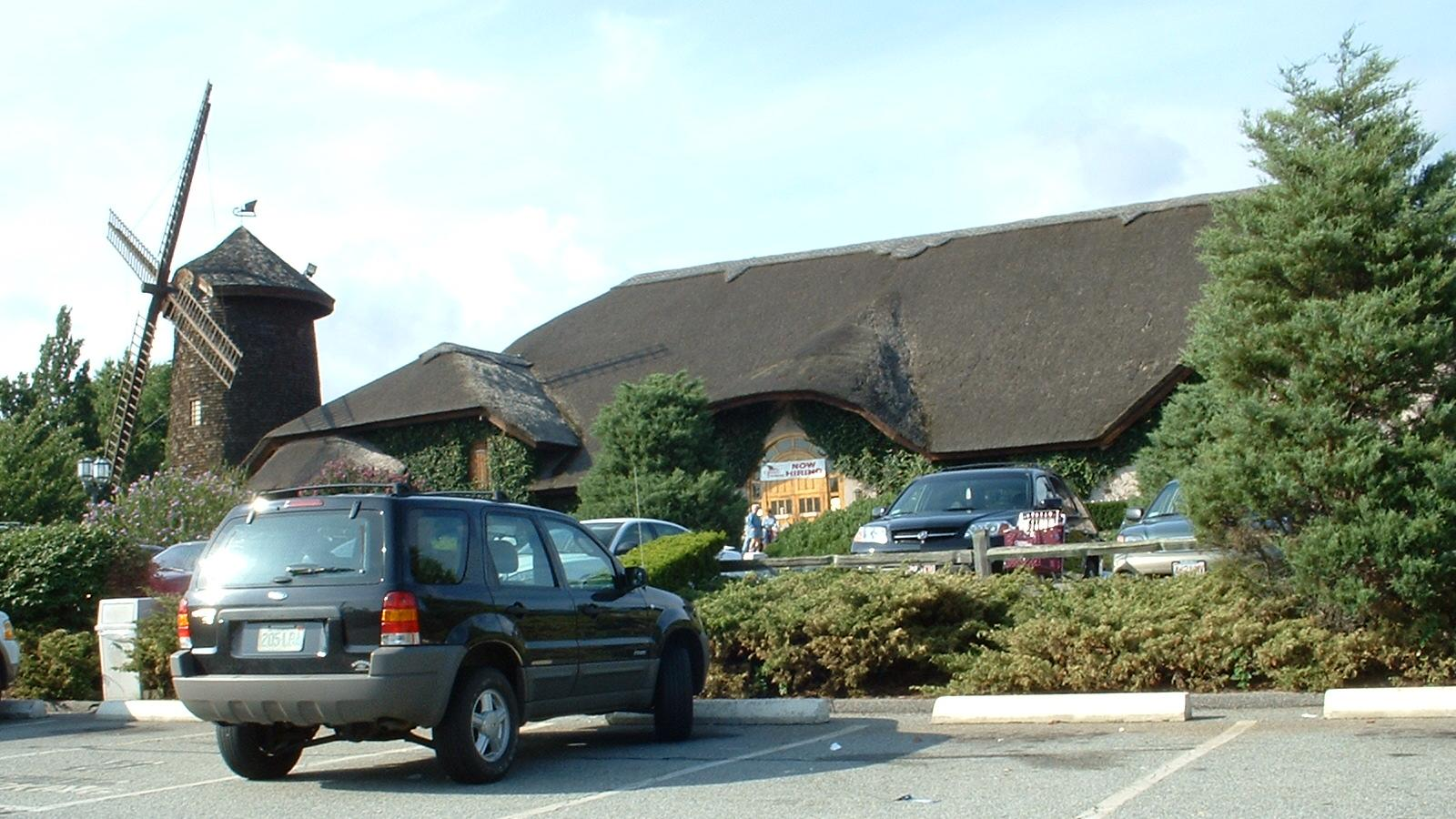
The Christmas Tree Shops store at the base of the Sagamore Bridge in Sagamore, Massachusetts

Christmas Tree Shops were bargain stores. They sold food, toys, household furnishings, Christmas decorations, and other seasonal holiday decorations. Most stores were typically reminiscent of older buildings (Colonial, Victorian, or even Old English barn styles, like in Sagamore, Pembroke, Massachusetts; and Warwick, Rhode Island). Some stores, like the Lynnfield, Massachusetts store, were even more conceptualized; said store was famous for its lighthouse and fishing village motif.
