= Gypsy (catboat) =

- WITCH (catboat)
- U.S. National Register of Historic Places
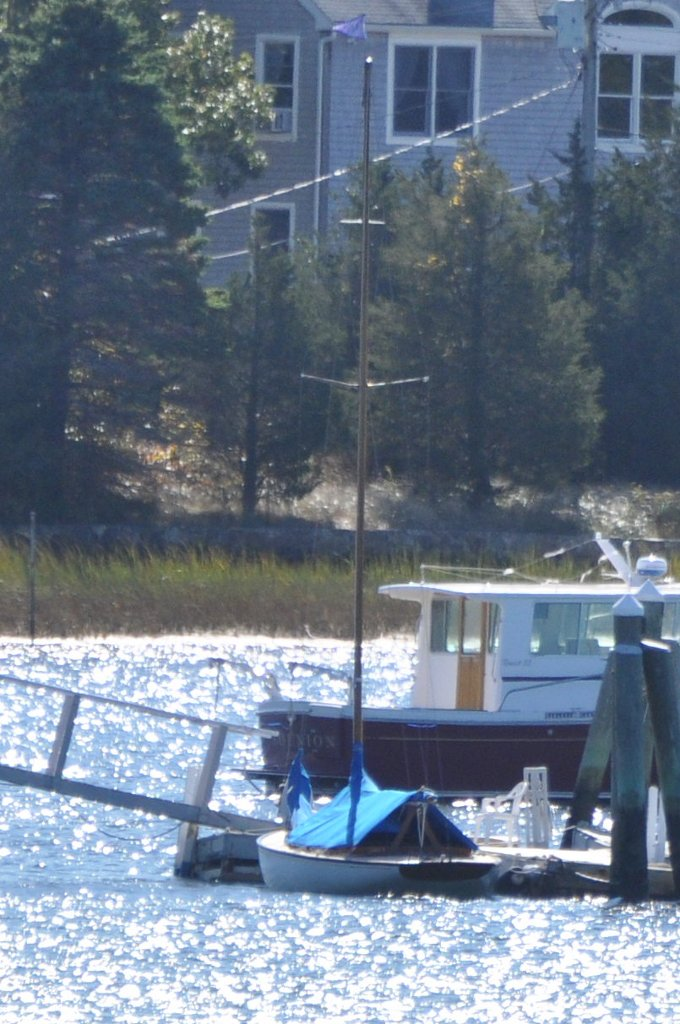

- Location within Massachusetts Location within the United States
- Location: Osterville, Massachusetts
- Coordinates: 41.624444°N 70.387222°W
- Area: less than one acre
- Built: 1900
- Built by: Bowdoin B. Crowninshield
- Designed by: Bowdoin B. Crowninshield
- Architectural style: Catboat
- NRHP reference No.: 08000533
- Added to NRHP: June 18, 2008

The Gypsy (previously known as the Witch and the Wren) is a historic catboat. She was designed and built in 1900 by Bowdoin B. Crowninshield, as one of four identical sailing vessels, and was designated Crowninshield #149. Her design was influenced by the "Seawanhaka Rule", instituted at the Seawanhaka Corinthian Yacht Club to govern important characteristics of racing boats. She has a spoon bow, low freeboard, and long overhangs rising out of the water fore and aft. Her hull is made of white cedar on an oaken frame, although the top levels have been replaced with cypress.

The boat design was commissioned by Charles Henry Davis, who received the Hun, the first of the four boats built. The Witch was the second in the series, and was delivered to Osborne Howes II. (In-laws of Howes purchased the other two.) The Witch was first berthed at the summer house of the Howeses in Yarmouth, Massachusetts, which was called "The Witch House", and used by the family in informal races. She was sold by Howes in 1926, and came into the hands of Edward Barus, who sailed her in the Osterville area. After she was damaged in the New England Hurricane of 1938, she was rerigged from a gaff rig to a Marconi rig. In 1949, the boat, now named Wren, was purchased by Marjorie O'Brien, its last private owner, who gave the boat its present name. The boat was donated to the Osterville Historical Museum in 2008, and is on display during the summer months.

The boat was listed on the National Register of Historic Places in 2008.

== See also ==
- National Register of Historic Places listings in Barnstable, Massachusetts
