= Bowdoin B. Crowninshield =

American naval architect (1867–1948)

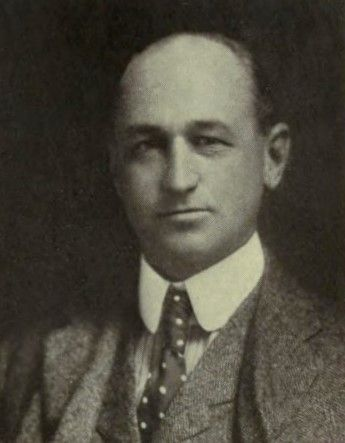
- Bowdoin B. Crowninshield
- Born: Bowdoin Bradlee Crowninshield; October 13, 1867; New York City, U.S.
- Died: August 12, 1948 (aged 80); Marblehead, Massachusetts, U.S.
- Education: Harvard University (1890)
- Occupation: Naval architect
- Spouses: Priscilla Janet McPhail (m. 1900; died 1915) Laura A. Wildar (m. 1916)
- Children: 1
- Parent(s): Benjamin W. Crowninshield; Katherine May Bradlee
- Relatives: Louise du Pont (sister-in-law)

Bowdoin Bradlee Crowninshield (October 13, 1867 – August 12, 1948) was an American naval architect who specialized in the design of racing yachts.

== Early life ==
Crowninshield was born on October 13, 1867, in New York City. He grew up in Marblehead, Massachusetts, in the wealthy Crowninshield family with long-standing ties to the sea. The family estate, Crowninshield House, was built by his father in 1870. His father was Benjamin Williams Crowninshield (1837–1892) and his mother was Katherine May Bradlee (1844–1902). His younger brother Francis Boardman Crowninshield (1869–1950), married heiress Louise Evelina du Pont (1877–1958).

Through his paternal grandmother Sarah Gool Putnam (1810–1880), he was a distant cousin of architect J. Pickering Putnam (1847–1917). His great-grandfather Benjamin Williams Crowninshield (1772–1851) had served as Secretary of the Navy, and his great-granduncle George Crowninshield Jr. (1766–1817) built the first luxury yacht in the United States, Cleopatra's Barge in 1816. His first cousin once removed was Frederick Josiah Bradlee, Jr. (1892–1970) whose son was journalist Benjamin Crowninshield Bradlee (1921-2014). Because of his many relations, he was known as "B.B." Crowninshield.

He attended Prince School in Boston and graduated from St. Paul's School in Concord, New Hampshire. He attended Massachusetts Institute of Technology in 1885, but transferred to Harvard University, where he graduated in 1890.

== Career ==
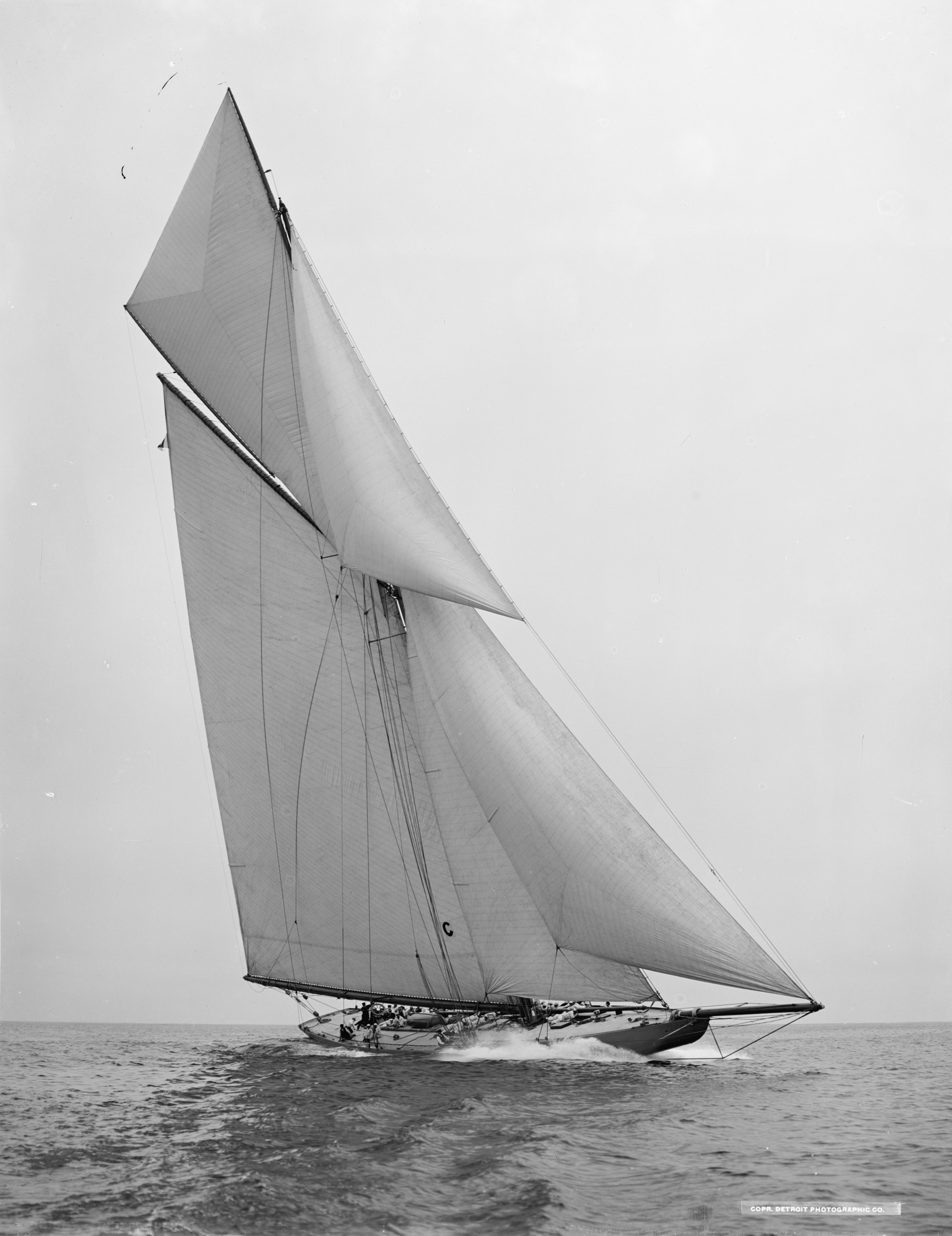
Sloop Independence, 1901

After graduating from Harvard, he speculated in real estate before signing on as a draftsman with John R. Purdon, a respected yacht designer in Boston with several knockabout designs to his credit. Crowninshield struck out on his own 18 months later, starting a yacht design and brokerage firm which quickly prospered. He would rise to become one of America's most respected yacht designers during a period which is now regarded as the golden age of American wooden yacht design.

He designed the schooner Adventuress, which was launched in 1913 and has been named a National Historic Landmark. Crowninshield is now best remembered for his working schooners and his America's Cup contender Independence (George Lawley & Son shipyard, 1901) for Thomas W. Lawson. He was also responsible for designing the iconic Dark Harbor 12 1/2 and 17 1/2 sloops. He served as president and general manager of Crowninshield Shipbuilding Company of Fall River, Massachusetts from 1917 to 1926. The shipyard built the "Six-Bitters" CG-130 through CG-139 for the United States Coast Guard (CG-133 would later serve as USS YP-45 during World War II).

He designed the unique seven masted schooner Thomas W. Lawson, named for his patron.

== Personal life ==
He married Priscilla Janet McPhail (1869–1915) on May 12, 1900. In 1902, he was fined and was sued for $10,000 for assaulting Adolphus G. McVey, the yachting editor of the Boston Herald, for a remark about his wife. After nine years, he was ordered to pay $448. His wife was found dead in a bathtub of a Boston hotel on October 8, 1915. She was checked in as "Mrs. Bowdoin", but the death was ruled accidental. Together, they were the parents of:

- William Widlar Crowninshield (1909–1987), who married Muriel Adese Longton (1915–2002).

In 1916, he married Laura A. Wildar (1877–1952), daughter of Leonard John Wildar. Laura had previously been married to Charles T. Long, whom she divorced in August 1915.

Crowninshield died August 12, 1948, in Marblehead.

== Existing examples of Crowninshield boat designs ==
- Schooner Adventuress, still sailing the Puget Sound
- Yacht Witchcraft, still sailing on Chesapeake Bay.
- Schooner Martha, still sailing the Puget Sound
- Catboat Witch
