= Taylor–Bray Farm =

- U.S. National Register of Historic Places
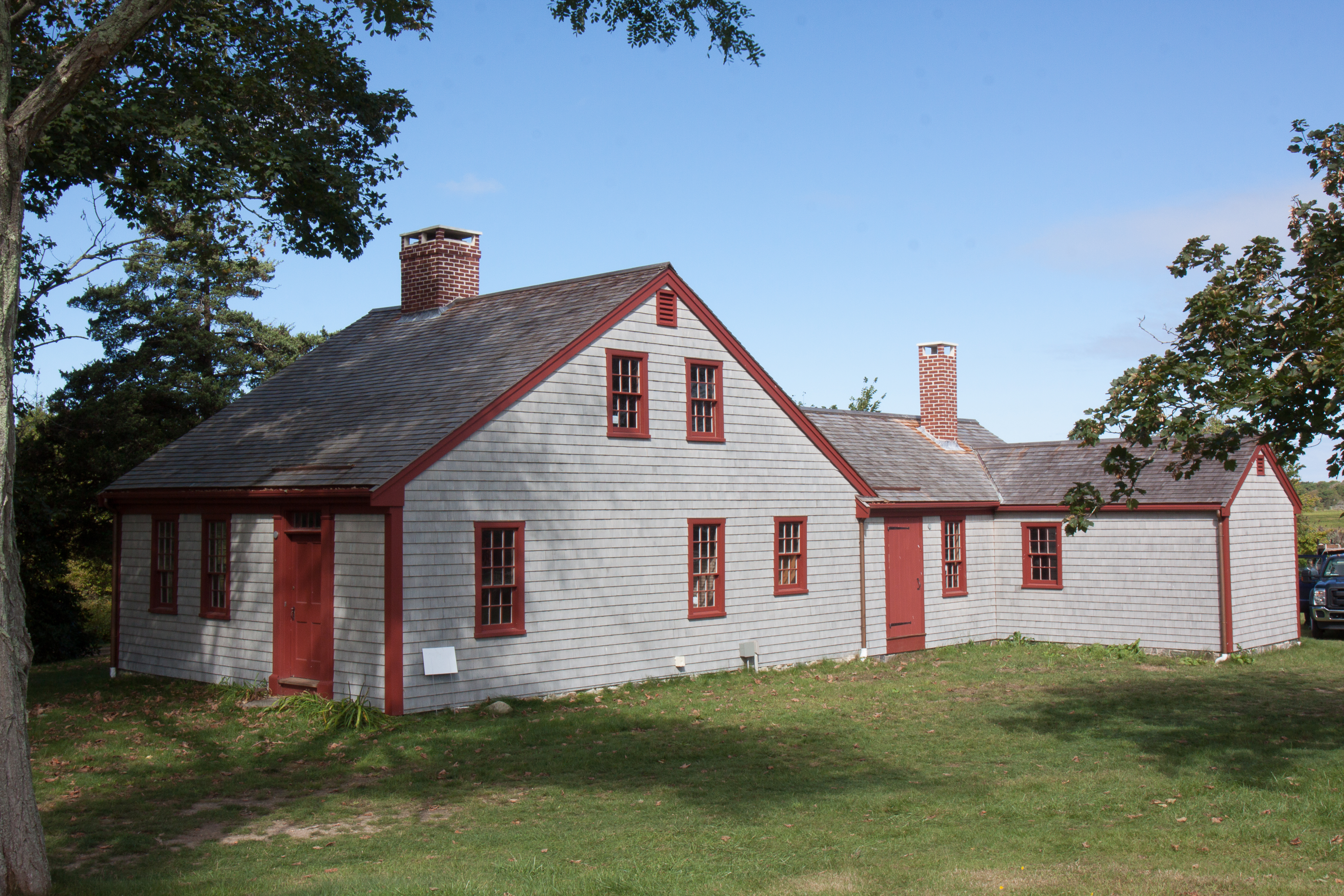
- Location: Jct. of Bray Farm Rd. N. and Nottingham Rd. Yarmouth, Massachusetts
- Coordinates: 41.72166°N 70.20516°W
- Built: c.1800 (house)
- NRHP reference No.: 92000287
- Added to NRHP: September 29, 1993

The Taylor–Bray Farm is a farm in Yarmouth Port, Massachusetts, and was originally owned and settled by Richard "of the Rock" Taylor in 1639 while it was still part of Plymouth Colony. Stephen Hopkins (settler), a distant maternal line ancestor (see below), was given permission to build a house and cut hay near this farm in 1638, but the first house in Yarmouth built by an Englishman was built by his son Giles in 1638.

Through many generations, it remained in the Taylor family until 1896, when Lucy W. Taylor sold the farm to George and William Bray, two brothers who had worked for the Taylors, and who were probably distant relatives. The property that Lucy sold for $400 included 50 acres (20 hectares) of uplands and adjacent marshlands which were capable of producing each year six tons of a combination of salt and fresh hay. The deed described the property as being in that part of Yarmouth known as Hockanom. It was sustained as a prosperous working farm by the Bray family until 1941. They continued to harvest salt marsh hay from Black Flat Marsh to feed their farm animals. The Brays often sold their strawberry and blueberry crops from a wheelbarrow on Old Kings Highway. In 1946 Robert J Williams purchased the farm and 88 acres for the tax due on the property. He moved from New Jersey to work for the Buzzards Bay Gas company until he retired. Robert Williams along with wife Katherin and son Robert Jr. lived on the farm and restored and improved the original farmhouse and surrounding land. They also improved the barn and a small apartment built into the side of the hill under the large ice-age boulder adjacent to the barn. Robert Williams introduced sheep to the farm and maintained them throughout his ownership. Although he worked a full-time job, he raised the sheep like the proud Welshman he was. He showed his sheep all over Massachusetts in county fairs. He sheared them and sold the wool. He also had several large vegetable gardens as well as wild and cultivated blueberries, and raspberries. The farm provided a great deal of food for the family. Robert Jr. built a home up the road for his new wife, and had a son in that house in the mid-1950s. Later he would move the family to south Yarmouth. The grandchildren would spend weekends on the farm up until the mid-1960s. The Williams family sold the farm they loved and cared for to a developer in the 1970s when Katherine became ill and could not keep up with the demands of the property. The terms stipulated that the farmhouse and barn be preserved. The Williams family saved the farm from destruction in the 1940s and in the 1970s. By the late 1980s, ownership changed hands a number of times, and the buildings saw neglect.

In 1987, the prospect of non-farm use of the land prompted the Town of Yarmouth to purchase the property. The specific intent was "to maintain the farm for historic preservation and conservation". Tenant/managers have lived in the farmhouse, welcoming the public and educating school groups about the farm's history and natural environment.

The farm, a rare survivor of a type of property that once characterized north side agricultural development, was placed on the National Register of Historic Places in 1993. The farm consists of approximately 22 acres (8 hectares) bordering Chase Garden Creek and the Black Flats marsh and includes four fixed structures, including a 1/2 Cape farmhouse, a barn, a caretaker's cottage, and a small storage building. A small flock of sheep is still kept at the farm.

The non-profit Taylor–Bray Farm Preservation Association (TBFPA) and the Yarmouth Historical Commission began an active collaboration in 2001 aimed at fixing up the property for greater public enjoyment. Extensive work remains to further restore the late-18th-century farmhouse and barn.

== Earliest farming conditions ==
An unpublished biography of Richard "Rock" Taylor by Mrs. Elizabeth Bray describes earliest farming conditions, the crude cow-houses, crude shelters for crops, and suitable fruit trees, mostly applicable to the neighboring larger Hallett farm. A cow-house (barn) only sheltered the cows and other stock; the fodder (usually salt hay) was stacked outside. The crops (corn) were stored in crude shelters made of poles with only the roof made of boards. The Kentish cherry trees were planted around the edge of the orchard to protect the less hardy trees within. The apple trees were often inferior seedlings, but could be good Pignoses (winter apple) or Foxwell (fall apple), or grafts on the inferior seedlings. The pears were also inferior seedlings, but there were grafts of the French Sugar Pear and the Black Worcester, and later the Catherine (from Boston) and the Orange; the trees were hardy and long-lived.

== See also ==
- Plymouth Colony
- Constance Hopkins Children of Constance and Nicholas Snow
- National Register of Historic Places listings in Barnstable County, Massachusetts
