= Red Wilson Field =

Baseball venue in Yarmouth, Massachusetts

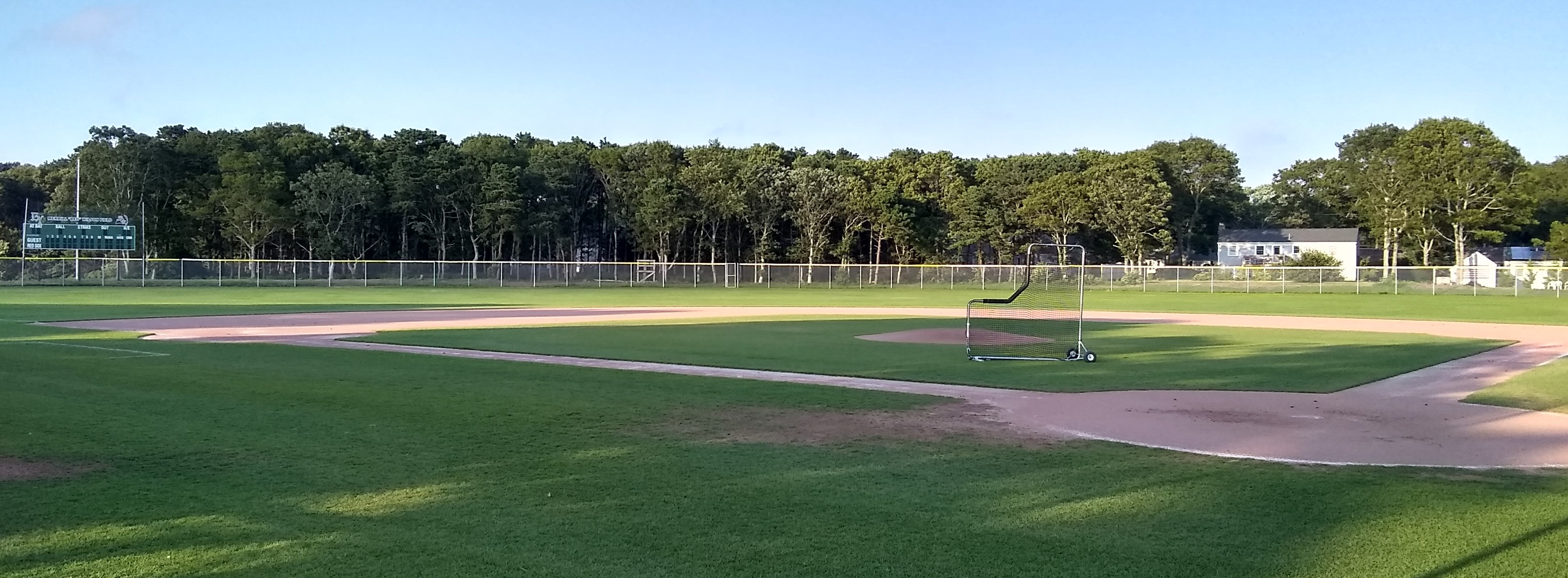
- Interactive map of Red Wilson Field
- Full name: Merrill "Red" Wilson Field
- Address: 210 Station Ave
- Location: Yarmouth, Massachusetts
- Coordinates: 41.6774°N 70.1940°W
- Capacity: 5,500
- Surface: Grass
- Field size: Left Field: 346 ft Center Field: 352 ft Right Field: 338 ft

Construction
- Opened: 1957
- Renovated: 2009

Tenant
- Yarmouth–Dennis Red Sox

Merrill "Red" Wilson Field is a baseball venue in Yarmouth, Massachusetts, home to the Yarmouth–Dennis Red Sox of the Cape Cod Baseball League (CCBL). Dennis-Yarmouth Regional High School is located to the southwest of the field. Red Wilson Field is one of three CCBL ballparks that does not have lights.

Constructed in 1957, the field began to be used regularly as the home field of the then "Yarmouth Red Sox" in 1973. In 1981 the field was renamed in honor of Merrill "Red" Wilson, a beloved teacher, administrator, coach and athletic director at Dennis-Yarmouth High School. Wilson was a seven-time CCBL all-star catcher for Yarmouth in the late 1950s and early 1960s. He went on to manage the team for 16 seasons and was inducted into the CCBL Hall of Fame as part of its inaugural class in 2000.

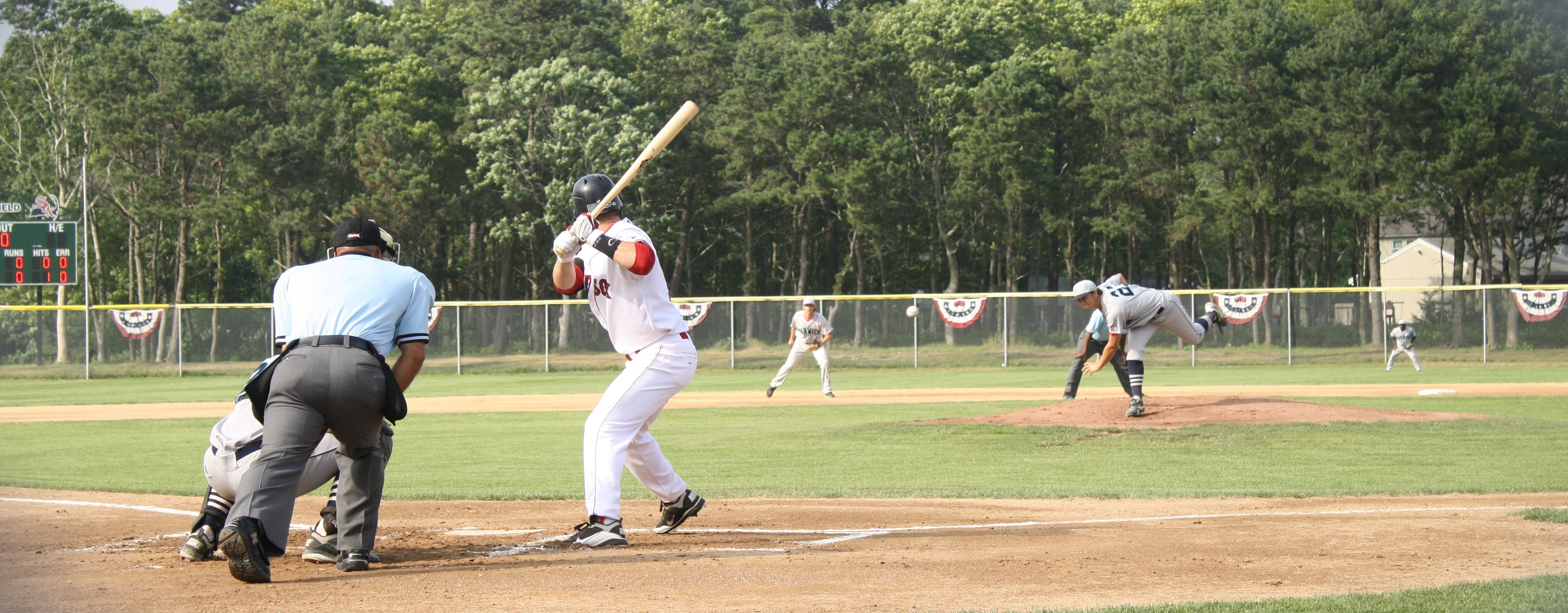
A game at Merrill "Red" Wilson Field, home of the Y-D Red Sox

Major improvements were made to Red Wilson Field thanks to a 2009 grant from the Yawkey Foundation. The ballpark hosted the CCBL's annual all-star game and home run derby festivities in 1996, 2006 and 2013, and has seen the Red Sox claim eight CCBL league titles, most recently in the three consecutive seasons from 2014 to 2016. The ballpark has been the summertime home of dozens of future major leaguers such as Buster Posey, Craig Biggio and Chris Sale.

The creative culinary offerings of the concession stand at Red Wilson Field have garnered national media attention from such publications as Baseball America, The Boston Globe, and MLB.com. Thousands of "donut burgers" have been sold at the ballpark since the concept was introduced in 2004 by its creator, "Burger Bob" Phillips. In lieu of a traditional hamburger bun, patrons can opt to order their burger served between the sliced halves of a donut. Various donut and topping combinations are given baseball-themed nicknames with gastric double-entendres such as "The Hurler", "The Sinker", and "The Boston Screamer".

== See also ==
- Cape Cod Baseball League
- Yarmouth-Dennis Red Sox
