= Josh Taves =

American football player (born 1972)

No. 92, 94, 99, 91
- Position: Defensive end

Personal information
- Born: May 13, 1972 (age 54); Watsonville, California, U.S.
- Listed height: 6 ft 7 in (2.01 m)
- Listed weight: 280 lb (127 kg)

Career information
- High school: Dennis-Yarmouth (Yarmouth, Massachusetts)
- College: Northeastern
- NFL draft: 1995: undrafted

Career history
- Detroit Lions (1995); Barcelona Dragons (1996); Jacksonville Jaguars (1996)*; New England Patriots (1996–1997); Miami Dolphins (1998)*; Barcelona Dragons (1998); New Orleans Saints (1998)*; Buffalo Destroyers (2000)*; Orlando Predators (2000)*; Oakland Raiders (2000–2001); Carolina Panthers (2002)
- * Offseason or practice squad member only

Career NFL statistics
- Tackles: 41
- Sacks: 4
- Interceptions: 1
- Stats at Pro Football Reference

Josh Heinrich Taves (born May 13, 1972, in Watsonville, California) is an American former professional football player who was a defensive end in the National Football League (NFL). He played college football for the Northeastern Huskies.

== Biography ==
Taves is Jewish. He grew up in Truro, MA, played football for Dennis-Yarmouth Regional High School, and for Northeastern University, where he twice made the Jewish All-American team.

He was named NFL Europe's 1998 Most Valuable Defensive Player, after he was co-leader in sacks in the league with 9 in 10 games for the Barcelona Dragons.

Taves signed with the Buffalo Destroyers of the Arena Football League for the 2000 season. On March 21, 2000, he was traded to the Orlando Predators for Mile Black.

In the NFL, he played defensive end for 29 games over three seasons for the Oakland Raiders and the Carolina Panthers.

== See also ==
- List of select Jewish football players
