= Dennis-Yarmouth Regional High School =

Coordinates: 41°40′40.71″N 70°11′37.09″W

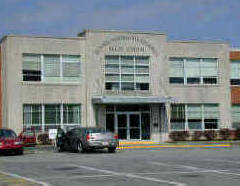

Location
- 210 Station Avenue; South Yarmouth, Massachusetts 02664; United States

Information
- Type: Public; Open enrollment
- Established: 1957
- Principal: Kendra Bennett
- Staff: 85.6 (FTE)
- Grades: 8–12
- Enrollment: 993 (2024–2025)
- Student to teacher ratio: 11.6
- Campus: Suburban
- Colors: Green & White
- Athletics: MIAA - Division 3
- Athletics conference: Cape and Islands League
- Teams: Dolphins
- Communities served: Yarmouth, Dennis
- Website: https://www.dy-regional.k12.ma.us/high-school

Dennis-Yarmouth Regional High School is a suburban public high school (grades 8–12) in Yarmouth, Massachusetts, United States. It opened in 1957 and was expanded and renovated in 1963, 1977, and 2006. The school serves the communities of Yarmouth and Dennis, and had an enrollment of 993 students in the 2024-2025 school year. Dennis-Yarmouth, or known more commonly to the locals as "D-Y", is the second largest high school (in terms of student population) on Cape Cod, behind only Barnstable High School. It is in South Yarmouth, just south of the Mid Cape Highway.

== Demographics ==
- The data includes eighth grade students. Eighth grade students = 234 (23.56%).

According to Massachusetts Department of Elementary and Secondary Education annual statistics, for the 2024-2025 academic year, the demographic enrollment distributions for race, gender and grade level at Dennis-Yarmouth Regional High School are as follows:

Total number of enrolled students: 993
Total number of full-time equivalent educators: 85.6
Therefore, the student to teacher ratio for this school is 11.6:1

Enrollment by Race/Ethnicity (2024-2025)
| Race | Enrolled Pupils* | % of District |
|---|---|---|
| African American | 164 | 16.5% |
| Asian | 24 | 2.4% |
| Hispanic | 142 | 14.3% |
| Native American | 21 | 2.1% |
| White | 570 | 57.4% |
| Native Hawaiian, Pacific Islander | 2 | 0.2% |
| Multi-Race, Non-Hispanic | 70 | 7.0% |
| Total | 993 | 100% |

* Approximate number of enrolled pupils is calculated based on total number of students in district, multiplied by reported percentage, and rounded to nearest whole student.

Enrollment by gender (2024-2025)
| Gender | Enrolled pupils | Percentage |
|---|---|---|
| Female | 469 | 47.23% |
| Male | 523 | 52.67% |
| Non-binary | 1 | 0.1% |
| Total | 993 | 100% |

Enrollment by Grade
| Grade | Pupils Enrolled | Percentage |
|---|---|---|
| 9 | 190 | 19.13% |
| 10 | 180 | 18.13% |
| 11 | 194 | 19.54% |
| 12 | 183 | 18.43% |
| SP* | 12 | 1.21% |
| Total | 993 | 100% |

* SP = Special Education Beyond Grade 12

== Athletics ==
=== Cross Country ===
The boys team won the All-State Championship in back to back years, the only boys team in Massachusetts to have done so (the MIAA switched from a single all-state championship race for each gender in cross country to large and small school state championship races in 1990) . Further, the boys team did it twice, in 1974/1975 and 1989/1990. Harrier magazine ranked them one of the top 25 teams in the United States in 1989 and 1990. The girls team won the Div. I (large schools) All-State team championship in 2006.

=== Field Hockey ===
In 2025 the field hockey team won the MIAA division 4 championship.It was the teams first win since 2018 when they were in division 2.

== Notable alumni ==
- Andrew Jamiel, FCF and XFL football player
- Amy Jo Johnson, actress
- Highly Suspect, rock band
- Josh Taves, NFL football player

== See also ==
- List of high schools in Massachusetts
