= Dark Harbor 17 1/2 =

Sailboat

Development
- Designer: B.B. Crowninshield
- Year: 1908
- Name: Dark Harbor 17 1/2

Boat
- Displacement: 3,420 lb (1,550 kg)
- Draft: 1.30 m (4 ft 3 in)

Hull
- General: Monohull
- Type: Displacement
- Construction: Wood
- LOA: 7.87 m (25 ft 10 in)
- LWL: 5.33 m (17 ft 6 in)
- Beam: 1.916 m (6 ft 3.4 in)

Hull appendages
- Keel: Full

Rig
- General: Gaff rigged sloop

Sails
- Total sail area: 311 sq ft (28.9 m^{2})

The Dark Harbor 17 1/2 is a 25 ft 10 in long class of sailboat designed by B.B.Crowninshield in 1908 as a daysailer and racer.

The mainsail is gaff rigged, with a jib that attaches to the masthead and bow. The displacement hull has a full keel hull with lead ballast and classic lines. It has a 25 ft 10 in length overall and a waterline length of 17 1/2 ft. Original construction was caravel planking over steam bent frames, although boats can also be built with modern methods such as cold moulding or strip planking. Decks can be built traditionally or using plywood sheathed in fibreglass.

The class was originally called the Manchester 17 1/2 after Manchester, Massachusetts, where the design first sailed. Its popularity spread to several summer communities in Maine, and was adopted by the Tarratine Yacht Club in Dark Harbor on the island of Islesboro, which renamed the boat the Dark Harbor 17 1/2.

About 200 boats had been built by 1935, with some still sailing today. New examples continue to be built with boats being sailed across America, Europe and the South Pacific.

The class is similar to the Dark Harbor 12 1/2.
