= West Yarmouth, Massachusetts =

- Census-designated place
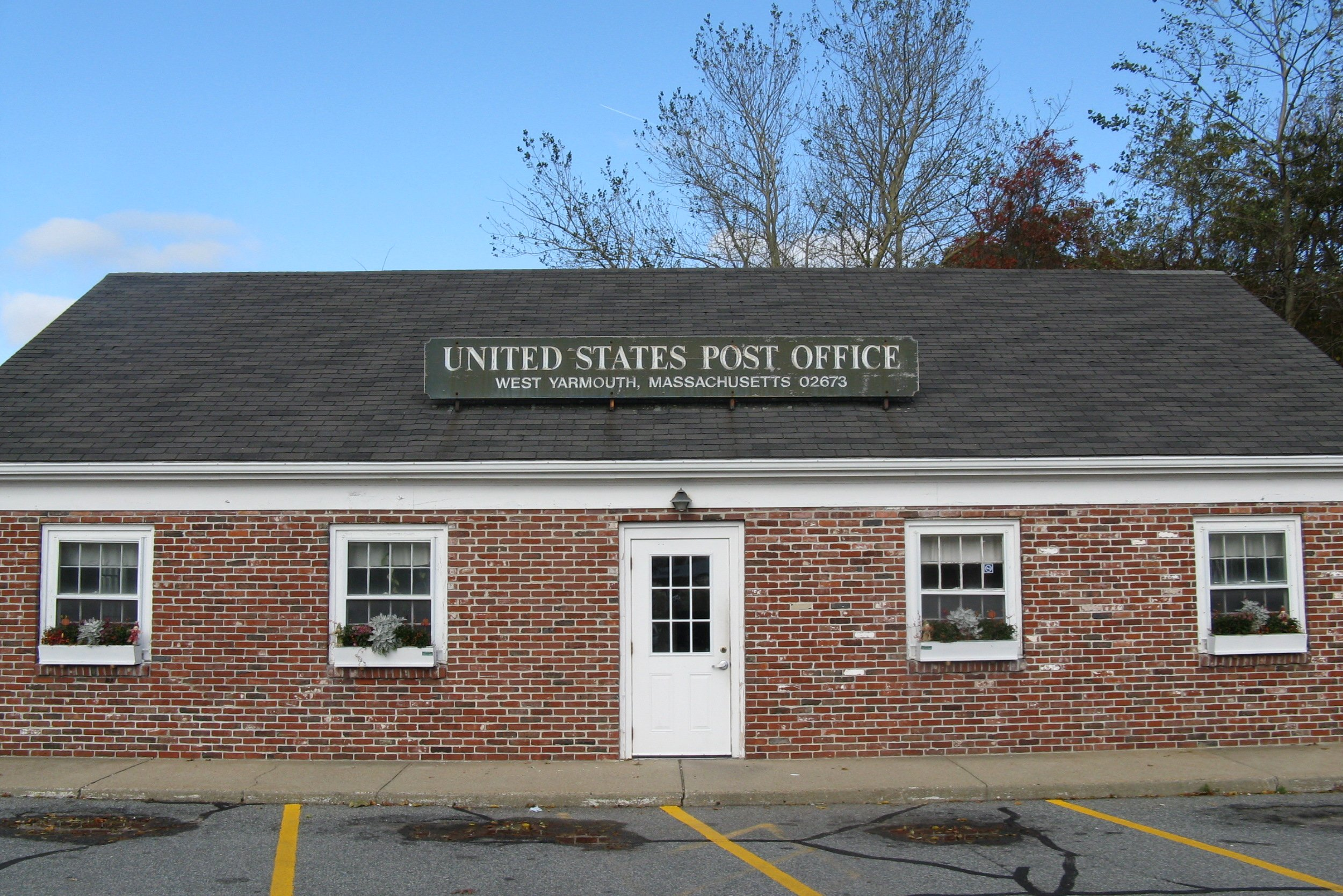
- West Yarmouth Post Office

- Location in Barnstable County and the state of Massachusetts.
- Coordinates: 41°38′58″N 70°14′47″W
- Country: United States
- State: Massachusetts
- County: Barnstable
- Town: Yarmouth

Area
  - Total: 9.09 sq mi (23.55 km^{2})
  - Land: 6.69 sq mi (17.33 km^{2})
  - Water: 2.41 sq mi (6.23 km^{2})
- Elevation: 20 ft (6 m)

Population (2020)
  - Total: 6,278
  - Density: 938.5/sq mi (362.36/km^{2})
- Time zone: UTC-5 (Eastern (EST))
  - Summer (DST): UTC-4 (EDT)
- ZIP code: 02673
- Area codes: 508/774
- FIPS code: 25-78795
- GNIS feature ID: 0615890

West Yarmouth is a census-designated place (CDP) in the town of Yarmouth in Barnstable County, Massachusetts, United States. As of the 2020 census, West Yarmouth had a population of 6,278.

== Geography ==
West Yarmouth is located in the southwest quarter of the town of Yarmouth at 41°38′58″N 70°14′47″W (41.649547, -70.246385). It is bordered to the east by South Yarmouth, to the west by Hyannis in the town of Barnstable, and to the south by Nantucket Sound. To the north is U.S. Route 6, the Mid-Cape Highway, beyond which is the CDP of Yarmouth Port.

According to the United States Census Bureau, the West Yarmouth CDP has a total area of 9.1 square miles (23.6 km^{2}), of which 6.7 square miles (17.3 km^{2}) is land and 2.4 square miles (6.3 km^{2}) (26.54%) is water.

== Demographics ==
Historical population
Census	Pop.	Note	%±
2020	6,278		—
U.S. Decennial Census

=== 2020 census ===
As of the 2020 census, West Yarmouth had a population of 6,278. The median age was 52.0 years. 14.9% of residents were under the age of 18 and 29.8% of residents were 65 years of age or older. For every 100 females there were 85.1 males, and for every 100 females age 18 and over there were 83.0 males age 18 and over.

99.6% of residents lived in urban areas, while 0.4% lived in rural areas.

There were 2,863 households in West Yarmouth, of which 20.6% had children under the age of 18 living in them. Of all households, 36.7% were married-couple households, 19.7% were households with a male householder and no spouse or partner present, and 35.8% were households with a female householder and no spouse or partner present. About 37.4% of all households were made up of individuals and 21.3% had someone living alone who was 65 years of age or older.

There were 4,973 housing units, of which 42.4% were vacant. The homeowner vacancy rate was 2.8% and the rental vacancy rate was 7.8%.

Racial composition as of the 2020 census
Race	Number	Percent
White	4,925	78.4%
Black or African American	257	4.1%
American Indian and Alaska Native	25	0.4%
Asian	109	1.7%
Native Hawaiian and Other Pacific Islander	2	0.0%
Some other race	281	4.5%
Two or more races	679	10.8%
Hispanic or Latino (of any race)	490	7.8%

=== 2000 census ===
As of the 2000 census, there were 6,460 people, 2,911 households, and 1,679 families residing in the CDP. The population density was 371.7/km^{2} (963.3/mi^{2}). There were 4,929 housing units at an average density of 283.6/km^{2} (735.0/mi^{2}). The racial makeup of the CDP was 93.10% White, 2.03% African American, 0.48% Native American, 0.53% Asian, 0.02% Pacific Islander, 1.47% from other races, and 2.38% from two or more races. 1.67% of the population were Hispanic or Latino of any race.

There were 2,911 households, out of which 20.5% had children under the age of 18 living with them, 42.6% were married couples living together, 11.9% had a female householder with no husband present, and 42.3% were non-families. 34.5% of all households were made up of individuals, and 16.5% had someone living alone who was 65 years of age or older. The average household size was 2.14 and the average family size was 2.73.

In the CDP, the population was spread out, with 17.7% under the age of 18, 6.0% from 18 to 24, 27.1% from 25 to 44, 25.3% from 45 to 64, and 23.9% who were 65 years of age or older. The median age was 44 years. For every 100 females, there were 87.9 males. For every 100 females age 18 and over, there were 83.6 males.

The median income for a household in the CDP was $35,597, and the median income for a family was $45,686. Males had a median income of $35,461 versus $26,188 for females. The per capita income for the CDP was $19,633. About 7.3% of families and 11.4% of the population were below the poverty line, including 16.9% of those under the age of 18 and 6.5% of those 65 and older.
