= Charles Henry Davis (civil engineer) =

American businessman and civil engineer

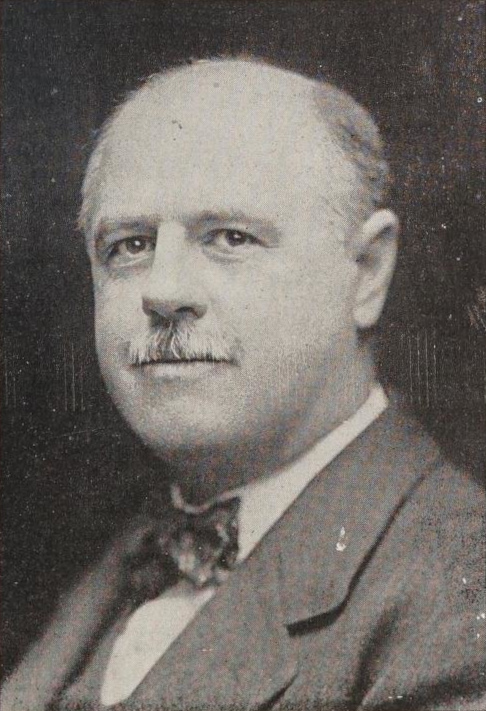
- Born: May 4, 1865; Montgomery County, Pennsylvania, US
- Died: June 3, 1951 (aged 86); New York, New York, US
- Occupations: Businessman; Civil engineer
- Organization: World Peace Movement
- Children: 6

Charles Henry Davis (also known as Carl Henry Davis; May 4, 1865 – June 3, 1951) was an American businessman and civil engineer. He was the president and co-founder of the National Highways Association. He founded the World Peace Movement.

== Early life and education ==
Charles Henry Davis was born into a Quaker family in Montgomery County, Pennsylvania. As a youth he lived in Philadelphia, Pennsylvania. As an adult he lived and worked in South Yarmouth, Massachusetts. He lived in the House of the Seven Chimneys. Davis was a yachtsman. He was married three times and fathered six children, all daughters. The House of Seven Chimneys was a group of houses and a barn artistically connected with a collective 217 windows and 17 front doors.

== Career ==
Davis' grandfather, Edward Morris, and father, Henry Corbit Davis, were involved in road construction industry. They started the American Road Machine Company. Davis inherited the company and was president of it. He is responsible for building a United States' first "high-speed" tram. It ran from Washington, D.C. to Mount Vernon, Virginia. Davis also owned the Kentenia Mining Company in Kentucky. He helped put Henry Ford into business by leasing his Kentucky mines to Ford to allow Ford to have a stable supply of coal to manufacture his automobiles. Ford paid a fixed price for every railcar of coal plus a royalty on each vehicle he manufactured.

=== National Highway Association ===
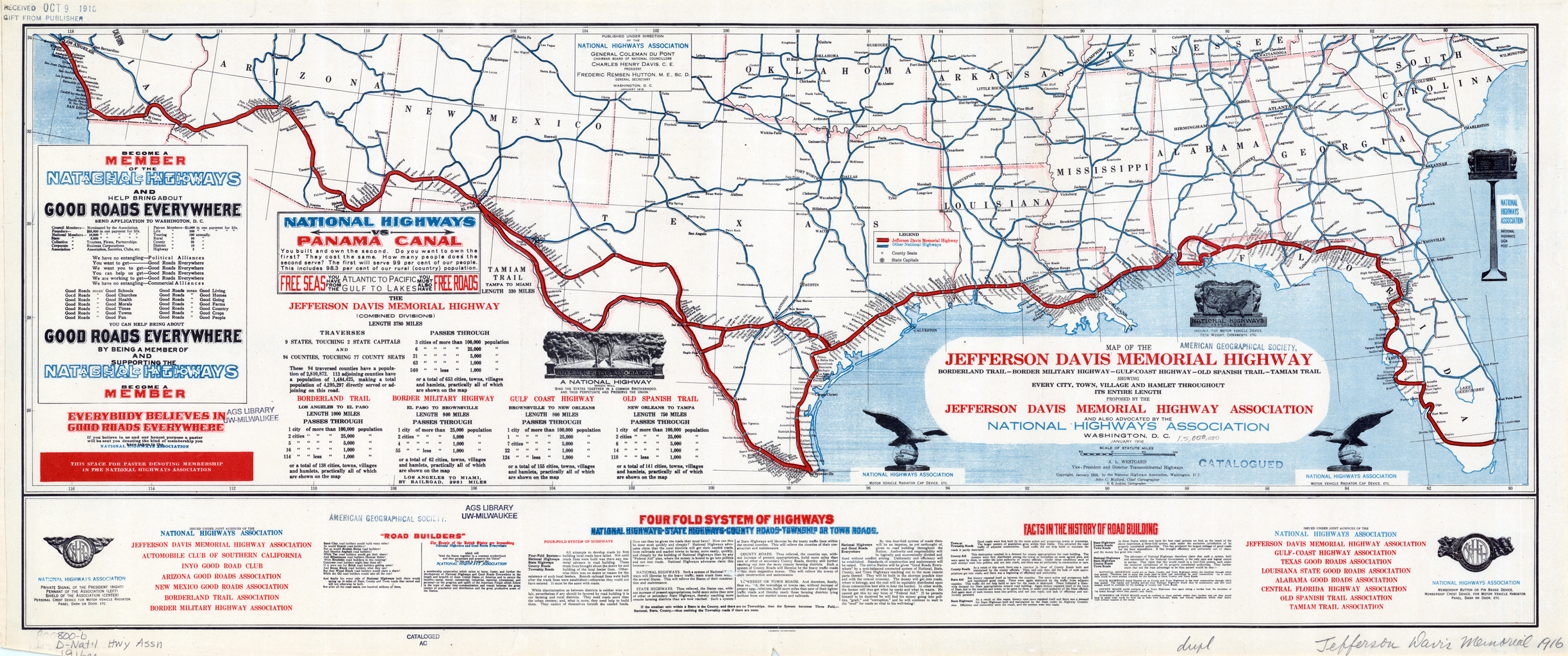
Map of the Jefferson Davis Memorial Highway, by E. E. Jenkins and John C. Mulford, January 1916

Davis founded the National Highway Association (NHA) in 1911 with the motto "Good Roads Everywhere!" The organization focused on promoting national highways in the United States. NHA created pamphlets and maps of the highway system in the country, which totaled upwards of 50,000 miles worth of road. NHA developed concepts for connecting highway systems with their own team of engineers. The Jefferson Davis Memorial Highway and the Lone Star Road are two examples of proposed national highways that were never executed. The association was based in Washington, D.C. and had offices in New York City and Yarmouth. Coleman du Pont was a member of the board.

He traveled extensively in his black Hudson automobile to speak to government official in his role with the NHA. His official license plate registered to his Hudson was Massachusets #25. He partucularly liked the number 25 so in the mid-1920s he requested every state, every Canadian province and the US and Canadian territories to send him plate #25. If they were not yet issuing license plates, he had a llicense plate company make one.Eventually he also received #25 plates from many foreign counties. He had them put all over his car and changed them every year. The earliest photo of this car these plares attached was inn 1924. In the photo shown. Is newspaper photo of the rear of his car with the license plares colorized to provide a better example of the attention drawn by his vehicle. When he traveled any substanntial distance, his mechanic followed him in another Hudson that was covered with auto club emblems. If his vehicle broke down, he would take this vehicle and leave the mechanic to fix his.

== Death and legacy ==
Davis died at New York Hospital on June 3, 1951. He donated money to Columbia University in 1911 to fund the founding of a graduate program focused on highway engineering. He also founded Columbia's Davis Library of Highway Engineering. He donated $350,000 to create an engineering library at the University of Maryland in 1936. He funded the research of Alfred Adler. He was a fan of Winston Churchill. Davis raised $2 million to fund the creation of a statue of Churchill which would reside on the Dover Cliffs. However, the people of England did not want this statue so it was never given.
