= South Yarmouth, Massachusetts =

- Census-designated place
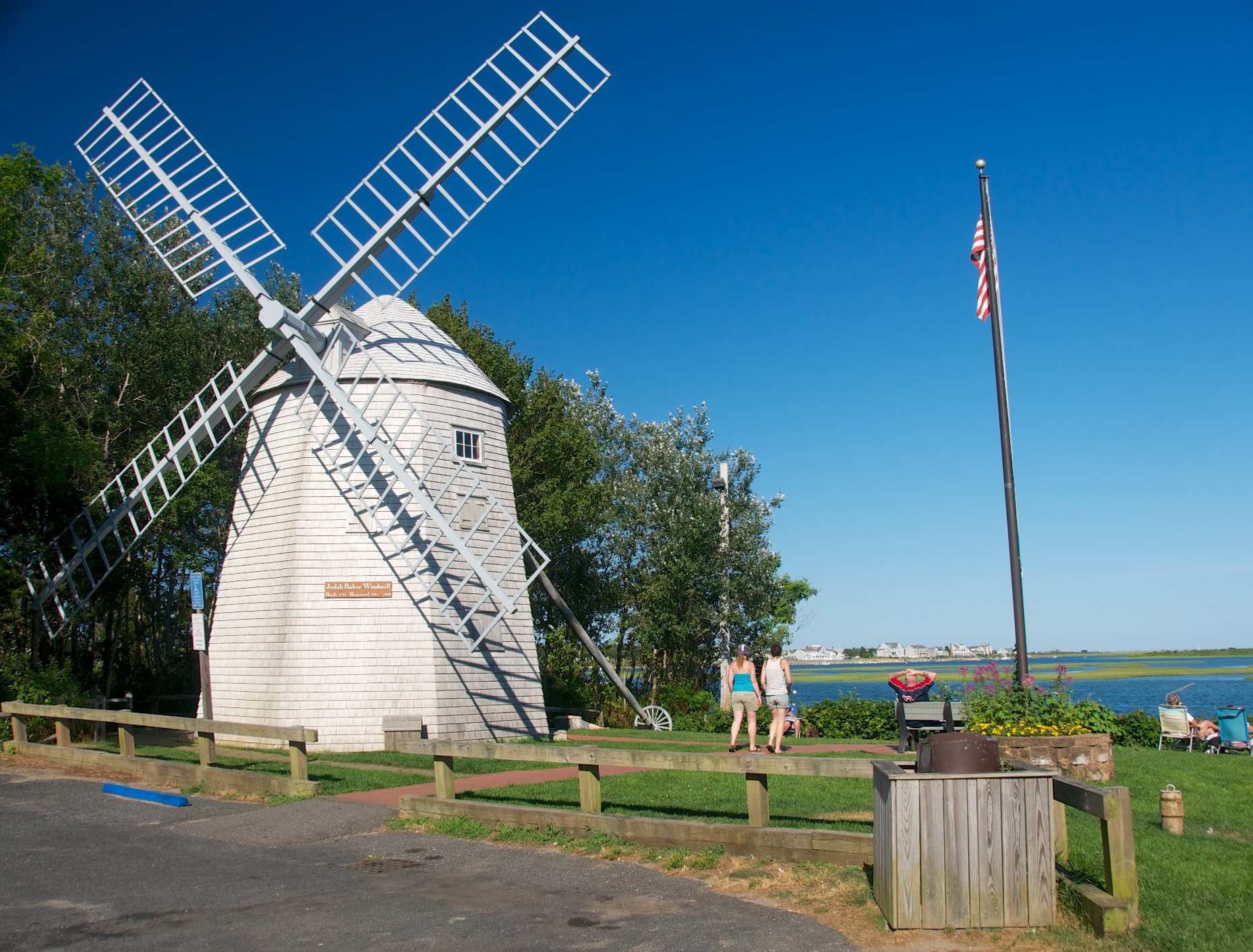
- Windmill Beach

- Location in Barnstable County and the state of Massachusetts.
- Coordinates: 41°40′4″N 70°11′59″W
- Country: United States
- State: Massachusetts
- County: Barnstable
- Town: Yarmouth

Area
  - Total: 7.81 sq mi (20.23 km^{2})
  - Land: 6.96 sq mi (18.02 km^{2})
  - Water: 0.85 sq mi (2.21 km^{2})
- Elevation: 20 ft (6 m)

Population (2020)
  - Total: 11,703
  - Density: 1,682.5/sq mi (649.61/km^{2})
- Time zone: UTC-5 (Eastern (EST))
  - Summer (DST): UTC-4 (EDT)
- ZIP Codes: 02664 (South Yarmouth); 02673 (West Yarmouth)
- Area codes: 508/774
- FIPS code: 25-66035
- GNIS feature ID: 0615882

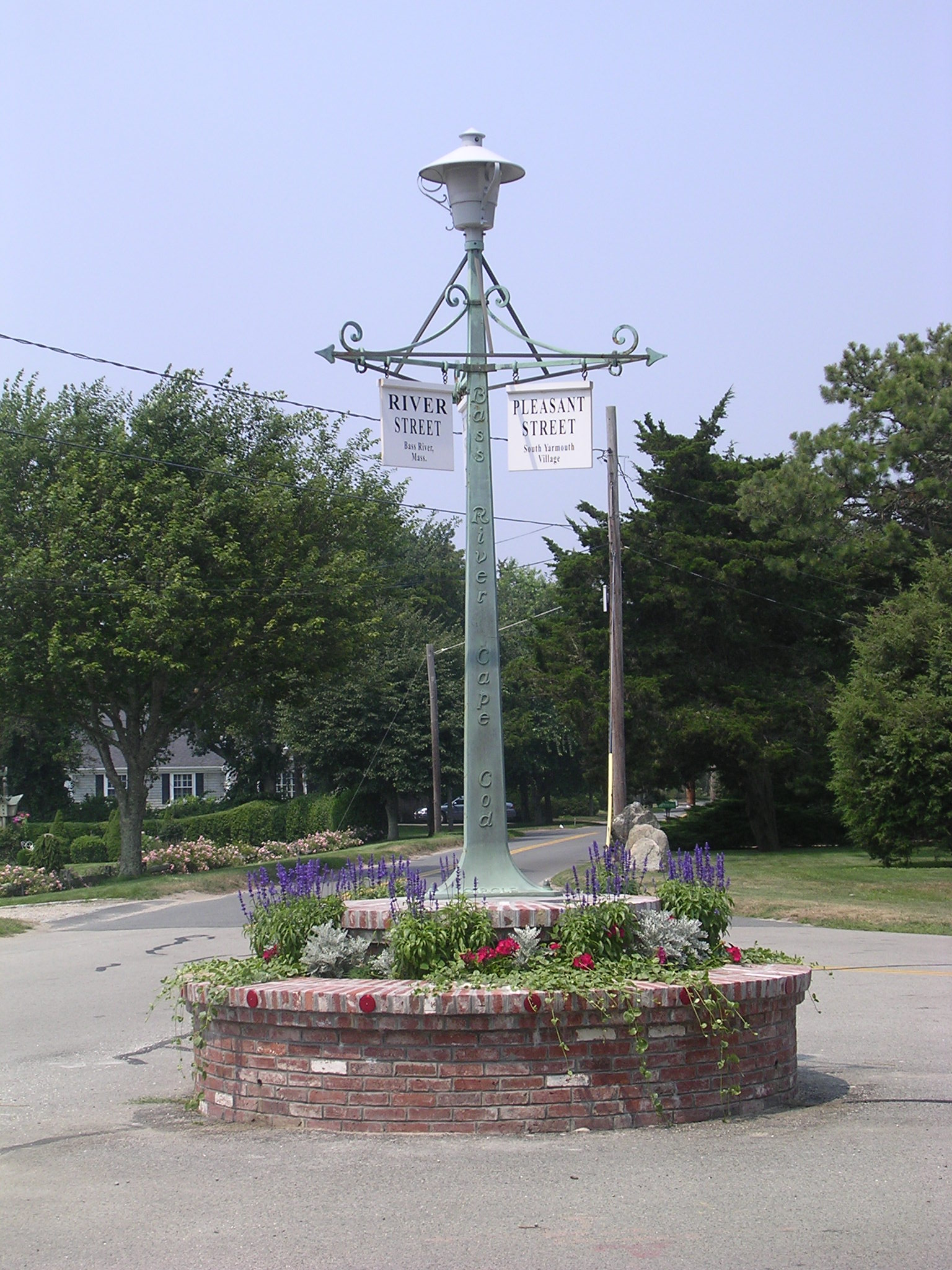
The first traffic rotary in the United States stands at the intersection of River Street and Pleasant Street.

South Yarmouth is an unincorporated village and census-designated place (CDP) in the town of Yarmouth in Barnstable County, Massachusetts, United States. As of the 2020 census, South Yarmouth had a population of 11,703, making it the most populous of the three villages in Yarmouth.

== Geography ==
South Yarmouth is located in the southeastern part of the town of Yarmouth at 41°40′4″N 70°11′59″W. It is bordered by the village of West Yarmouth to the west and the CDP of West Dennis to the east. U.S. Route 6, the Mid-Cape Highway, is to the north, beyond which is the village of Yarmouth Port.

According to the United States Census Bureau, the CDP has a total area of 7.8 square miles (20.2 km^{2}), of which 6.9 square miles (18.0 km^{2}) is land and 0.85 square miles (2.2 km^{2}) (10.94%) is water.

== Demographics ==
Historical population
Census	Pop.	Note	%±
2020	11,703		—
U.S. Decennial Census

=== 2020 census ===
As of the 2020 census, South Yarmouth had a population of 11,703. The median age was 53.4 years. 14.9% of residents were under the age of 18 and 31.5% of residents were 65 years of age or older. For every 100 females there were 88.7 males, and for every 100 females age 18 and over there were 85.5 males age 18 and over.

There were 5,327 households in South Yarmouth, of which 19.4% had children under the age of 18 living in them. Of all households, 41.7% were married-couple households, 18.2% were households with a male householder and no spouse or partner present, and 33.4% were households with a female householder and no spouse or partner present. About 35.5% of all households were made up of individuals and 20.7% had someone living alone who was 65 years of age or older. 100.0% of residents lived in urban areas, while 0.0% lived in rural areas.

There were 8,151 housing units, of which 34.6% were vacant. The homeowner vacancy rate was 0.6% and the rental vacancy rate was 17.9%.

Racial composition as of the 2020 census
Race	Number	Percent
White	9,467	80.9%
Black or African American	635	5.4%
American Indian and Alaska Native	26	0.2%
Asian	213	1.8%
Native Hawaiian and Other Pacific Islander	5	0.0%
Some other race	413	3.5%
Two or more races	944	8.1%
Hispanic or Latino (of any race)	476	4.1%

=== 2000 census ===
As of the census of 2000, there were 11,603 people, 5,485 households, and 3,181 families residing in the CDP. The population density was 640.0/km^{2} (1,656.9/mi^{2}). There were 7,834 housing units at an average density of 432.1/km^{2} (1,118.7/mi^{2}). The racial makeup of the CDP was 94.74% White, 1.53% African American, 0.34% Native American, 0.63% Asian, 0.06% Pacific Islander, 1.03% from other races, and 1.66% from two or more races. Hispanic or Latino of any race were 1.63% of the population.

There were 5,485 households, out of which 18.8% had children under the age of 18 living with them, 44.8% were married couples living together, 9.8% had a female householder with no husband present, and 42.0% were non-families. 36.3% of all households were made up of individuals, and 22.3% had someone living alone who was 65 years of age or older. The average household size was 2.08 and the average family size was 2.67.

In the CDP, the population was spread out, with 17.1% under the age of 18, 4.7% from 18 to 24, 23.2% from 25 to 44, 22.6% from 45 to 64, and 32.4% who were 65 years of age or older. The median age was 49 years. For every 100 females, there were 83.5 males. For every 100 females age 18 and over, there were 78.8 males.

The median income for a household in the CDP was $37,643, and the median income for a family was $44,325. Males had a median income of $35,476 versus $26,118 for females. The per capita income for the CDP was $20,609. About 5.5% of families and 7.3% of the population were below the poverty line, including 11.3% of those under age 18 and 3.9% of those age 65 or over.

== Education ==
The schools located in South Yarmouth are:

- Dennis-Yarmouth Regional High School
- Laurence C. MacArthur Elementary
- Station Avenue Elementary
- St. Pius X School (Grades PreK - 8)
- Superior Academy (Private Middle School)

Students from Dennis-Yarmouth Reg High School reside in both Yarmouth and Dennis Massachusetts.

== Notable people ==
Civil engineer and philanthropist Charles Henry Davis lived and worked in South Yarmouth.

Former NHRA drag racing Pro Stock star Scott Geoffrion was born in South Yarmouth.
