= Crowninshield House =

Historic house in Massachusetts, United States

- U.S. National Register of Historic Places
- U.S. Historic district – Contributing property
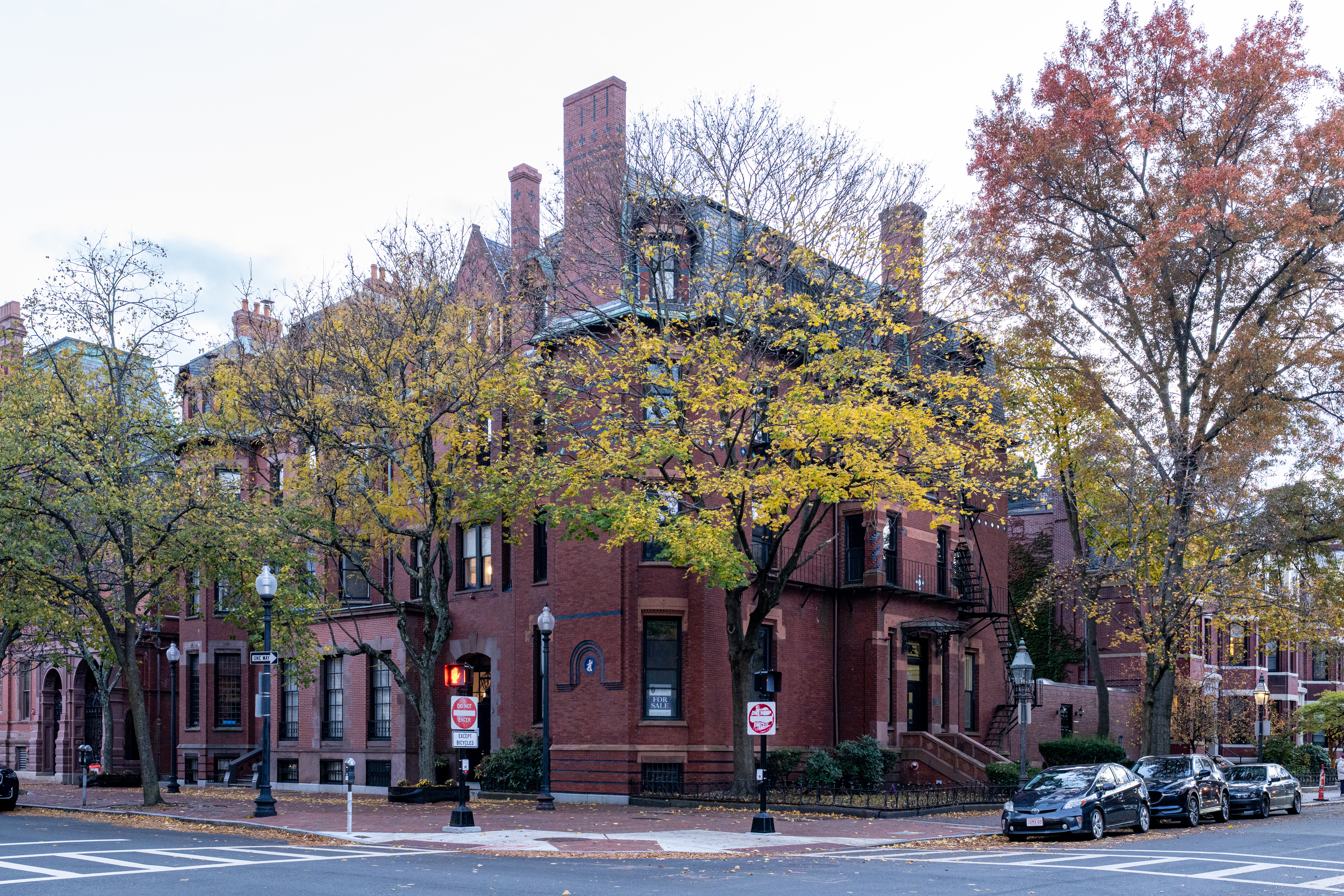
- Location: 164 Marlborough St., Boston, Massachusetts
- Coordinates: 42°21′9″N 71°4′45″W
- Built: 1870
- Architect: Henry Hobson Richardson
- Architectural style: Romanesque
- Part of: Back Bay Historic District (ID73001948)
- NRHP reference No.: 72000145

Significant dates
- Added to NRHP: February 23, 1972
- Designated CP: August 14, 1973

The Crowninshield House is a historic house at 164 Marlborough Street in the Back Bay neighborhood of Boston, Massachusetts. Built in 1870, it is the first residential design of the renowned architect Henry Hobson Richardson. It was added to the National Register of Historic Places in 1972.

== Architecture and history ==
The Crowninshield House stands at the southwest corner of Marlborough and Dartmouth Street. It is a four-story brick building, featuring a variety of trim in black brick, brownstone, and decorative green and blue tiles. It has a mansard roof, and a projecting two-story entrance section at the center of the main facade. The entry is flanked by sidelight windows and sheltered by a semicircular wrought iron hood.

Commissioned by Benjamin W. Crowninshield, the house was designed in 1868 and built in 1870 by H.H. Richardson. It is the earliest surviving example of Richardson's private residence work. Unlike many of his later works in the signature Romanesque style that he would develop, this house owes more to the Second Empire style. The house is, along with the former Trinity Rectory, one of two surviving Richardson houses in Boston.

== Benjamin Crowninshield ==
Benjamin William Crowninshield (1837–1892) was a member of the Boston Brahmin Crowninshield family. He attended Harvard College, graduating in 1858, along with classmates H.H. Richardson and Henry Adams. Adams' Education of Henry Adams (1918) includes descriptions of his friendship with Crowninshield.

Crowninshield studied history, publishing and speaking on various topics, such as yachting and military history. Published works include A History of the First Regiment of Massachusetts Cavalry Volunteers (Boston: Houghton, Mifflin and Co., 1891).

In 1868, Crowninshield commissioned his friend Richardson to design and build the house on Marlborough Street in the newly land-filled Back Bay area of Boston.

== See also ==
- National Register of Historic Places listings in northern Boston, Massachusetts

== Image gallery ==
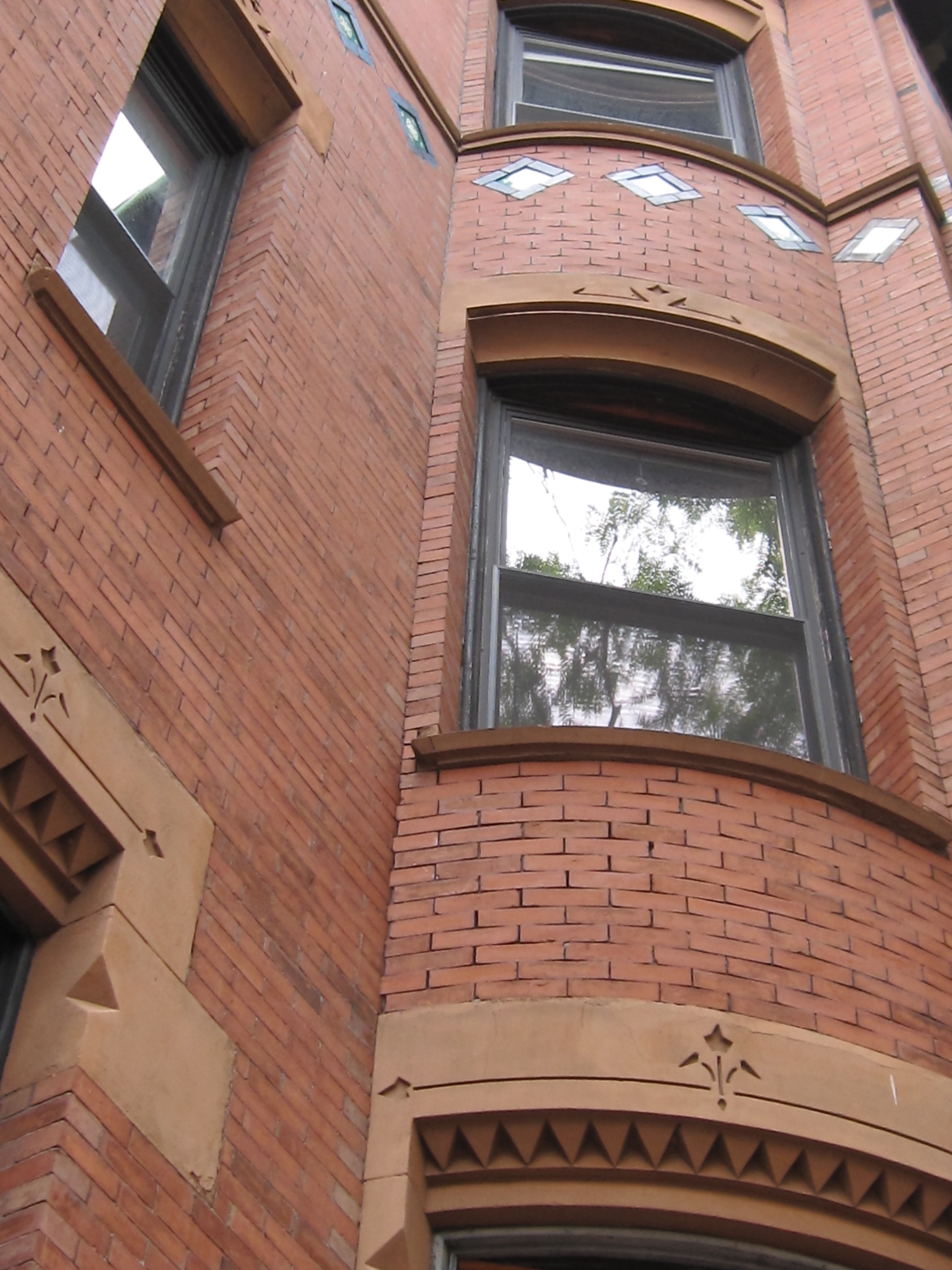

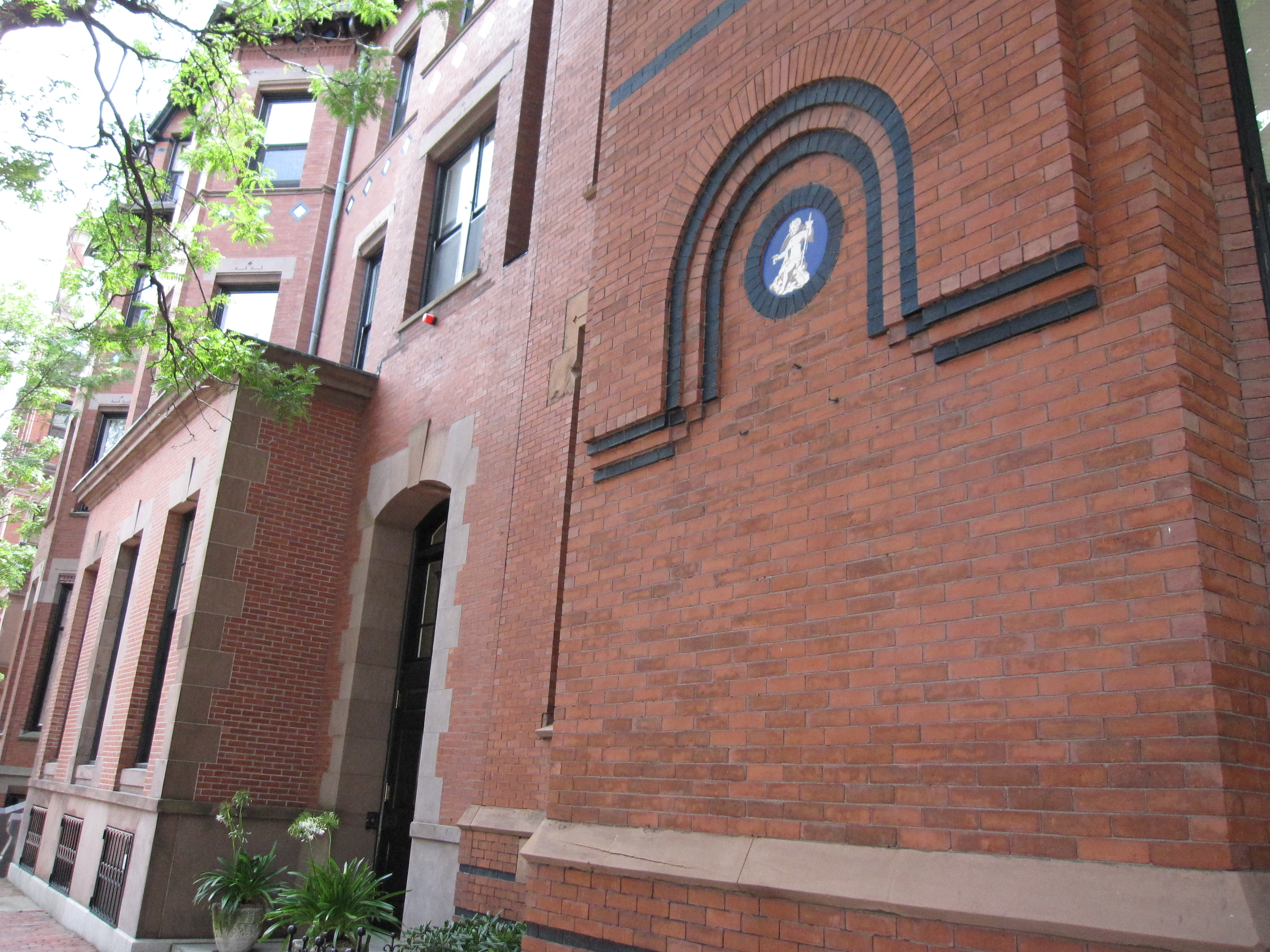

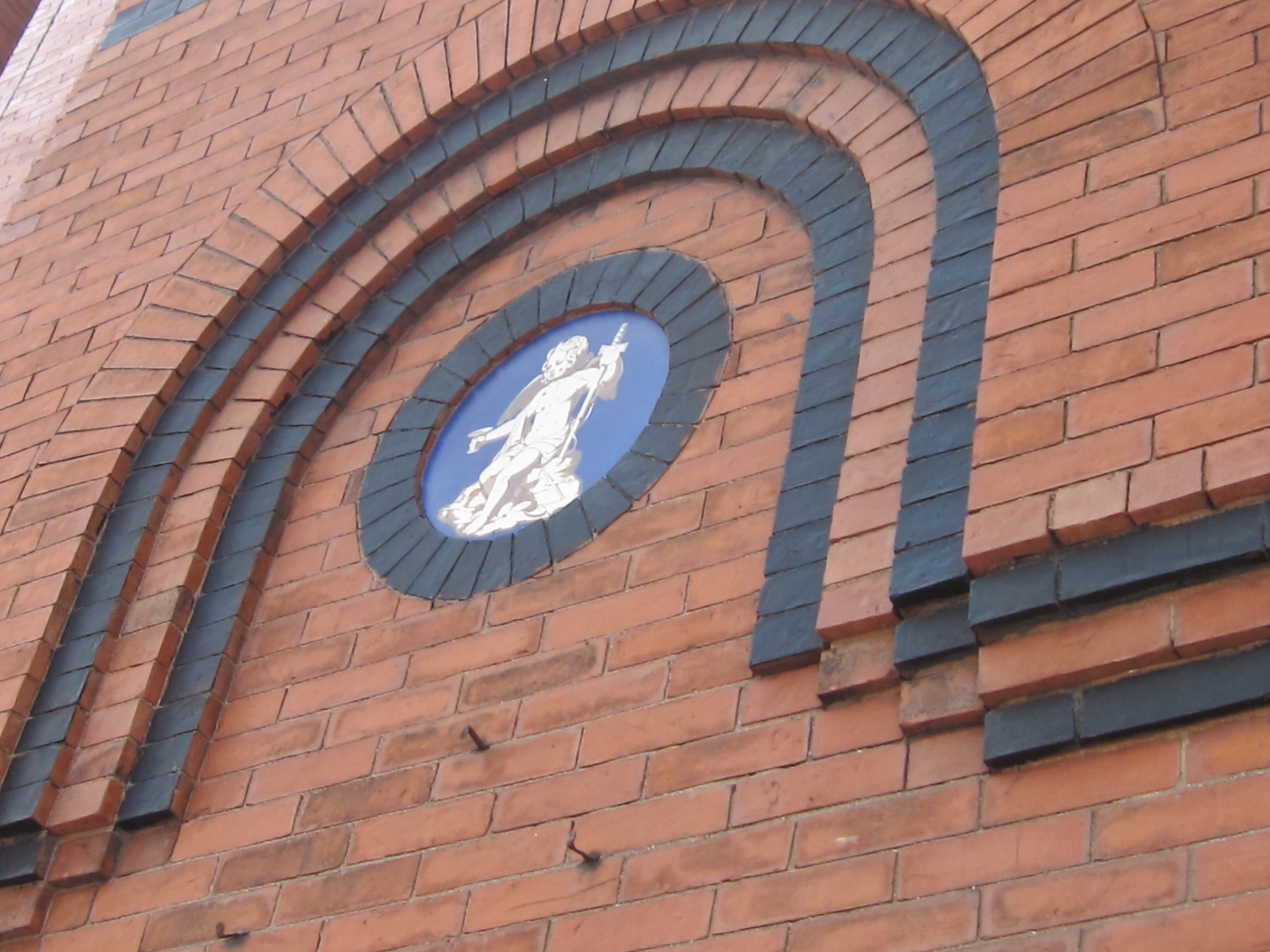

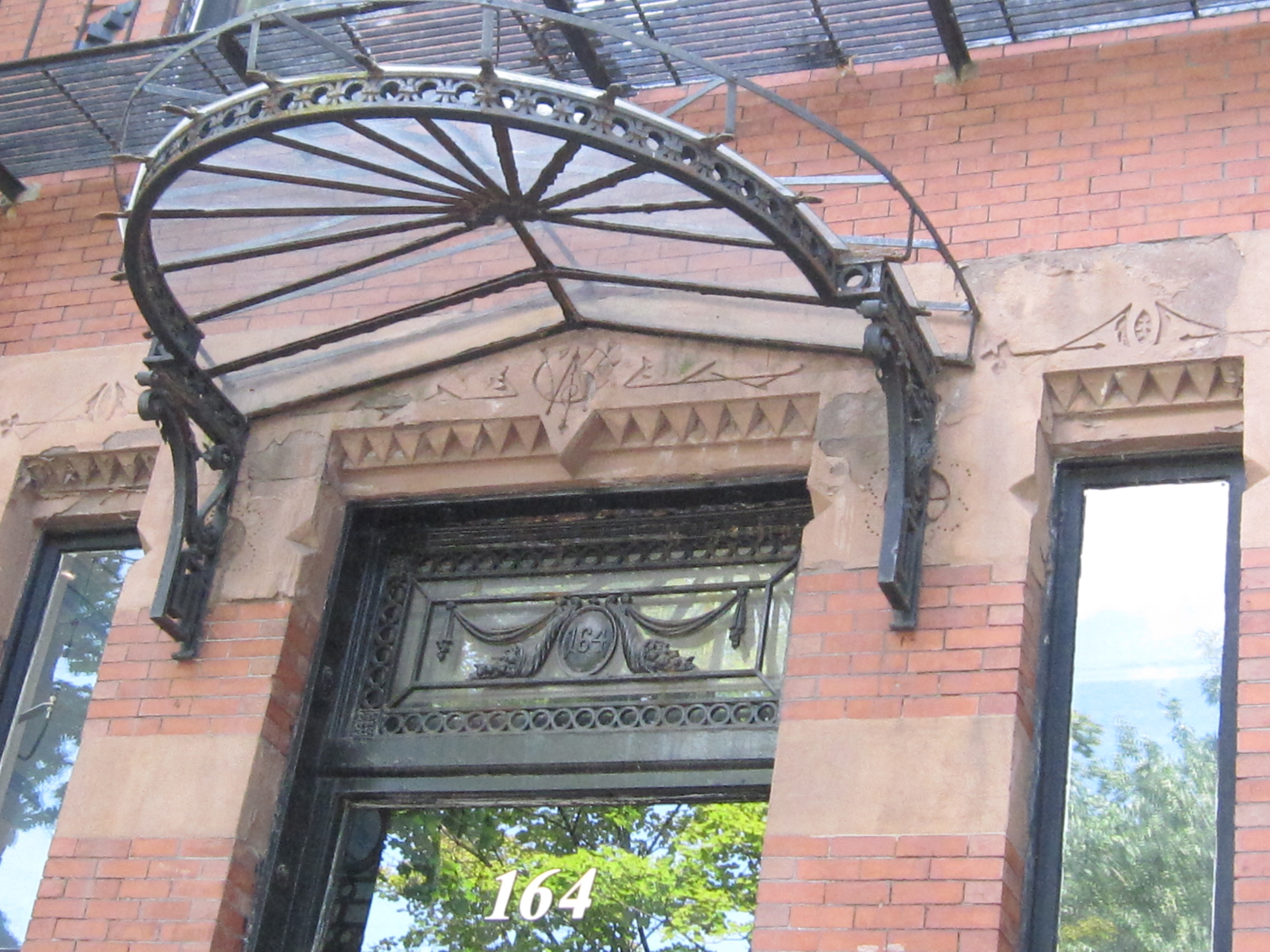
