= Yarmouth Port, Massachusetts =

- Census-designated place
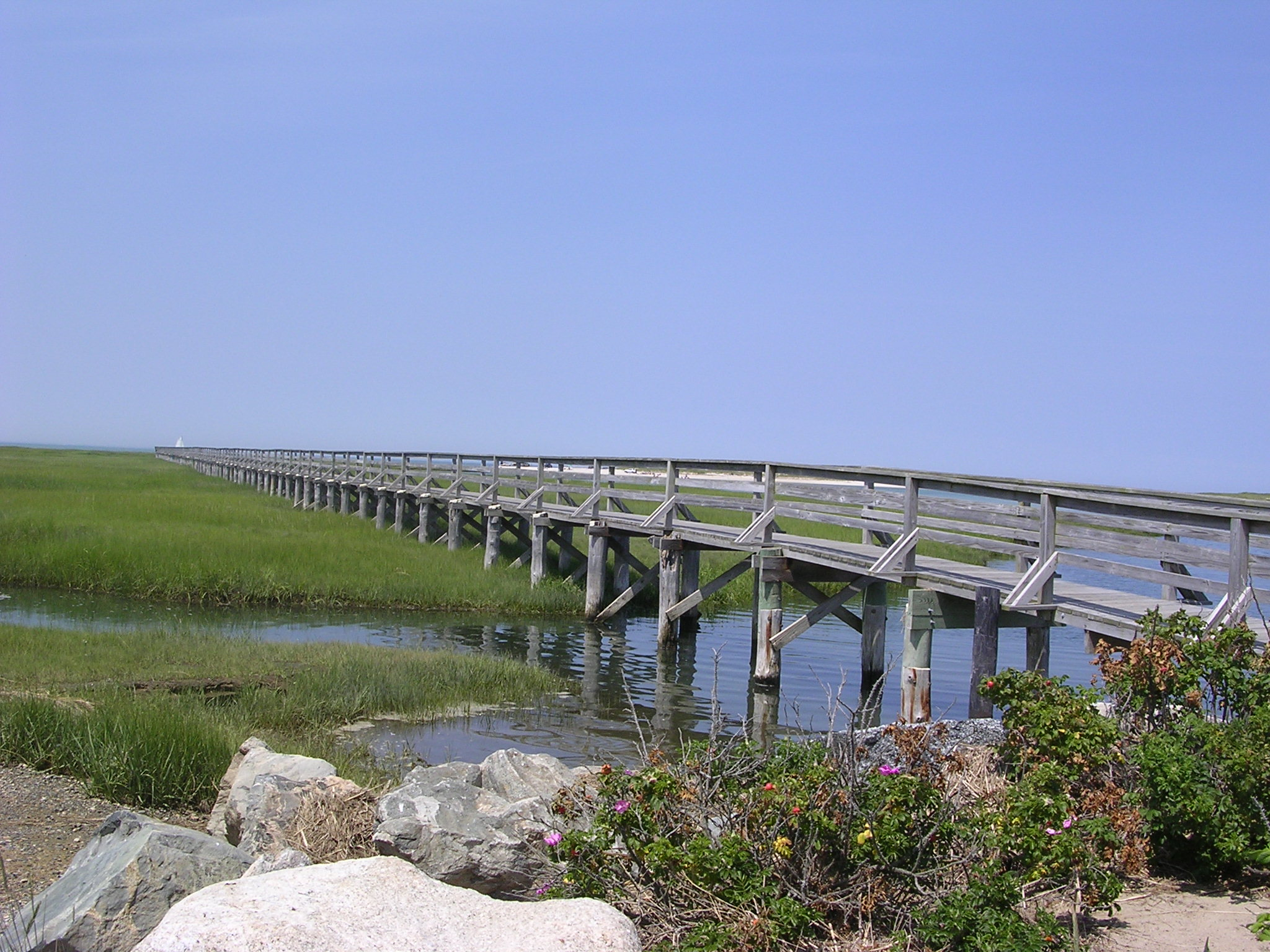
- Boardwalk at Bass Hole

- Location in Barnstable County and the state of Massachusetts
- Coordinates: 41°42′17″N 70°13′15″W
- Country: United States
- State: Massachusetts
- County: Barnstable
- Town: Yarmouth

Area
  - Total: 6.48 sq mi (16.78 km^{2})
  - Land: 6.02 sq mi (15.59 km^{2})
  - Water: 0.46 sq mi (1.19 km^{2})
- Elevation: 52 ft (16 m)

Population (2020)
  - Total: 5,403
  - Density: 897.7/sq mi (346.59/km^{2})
- Time zone: UTC-5 (Eastern (EST))
  - Summer (DST): UTC-4 (EDT)
- ZIP Code: 02675
- Area codes: 508/774
- FIPS code: 25-82595
- GNIS feature ID: 0615805

Yarmouth Port (or Yarmouthport) is a census-designated place (CDP) in the town of Yarmouth in Barnstable County, Massachusetts, United States. As of the 2020 census, Yarmouth Port had a population of 5,403.

Yarmouth Port was home to the original Christmas Tree Shops until its closing in 2007. The town is home to the international headquarters of IFAW.

== Geography ==
Yarmouth Port is located in the northern part of the town of Yarmouth at 41°42′17″N 70°13′15″W (41.704633, −70.220923). It is bordered to the north by Cape Cod Bay, to the east by the town of Dennis, and to the west by the town of Barnstable. U.S. Route 6, the Mid-Cape Highway, is to the south, beyond which are the CDPs of South Yarmouth and West Yarmouth.

According to the United States Census Bureau, the Yarmouth Port CDP has a total area of 6.47 square miles (16.76 km^{2}), of which 6.04 square miles (15.65 km^{2}) is land, and 0.43 square miles (1.11 km^{2}) (6.86%) is water.

== Demographics ==
Historical population
Census	Pop.	Note	%±
2020	5,403		—
U.S. Decennial Census

=== 2020 census ===
As of the 2020 census, Yarmouth Port had a population of 5,403. The median age was 62.0 years. 11.5% of residents were under the age of 18 and 45.2% of residents were 65 years of age or older. For every 100 females there were 84.8 males, and for every 100 females age 18 and over there were 81.4 males age 18 and over.

94.0% of residents lived in urban areas, while 6.0% lived in rural areas.

There were 2,629 households in Yarmouth Port, of which 14.4% had children under the age of 18 living in them. Of all households, 51.3% were married-couple households, 12.2% were households with a male householder and no spouse or partner present, and 31.1% were households with a female householder and no spouse or partner present. About 32.5% of all households were made up of individuals and 24.7% had someone living alone who was 65 years of age or older.

There were 3,328 housing units, of which 21.0% were vacant. The homeowner vacancy rate was 1.3% and the rental vacancy rate was 1.8%.

Racial composition as of the 2020 census
Race	Number	Percent
White	4,919	91.0%
Black or African American	77	1.4%
American Indian and Alaska Native	7	0.1%
Asian	58	1.1%
Native Hawaiian and Other Pacific Islander	0	0.0%
Some other race	70	1.3%
Two or more races	272	5.0%
Hispanic or Latino (of any race)	121	2.2%

=== 2000 census ===
At the 2000 census there were 5,395 people, 2,546 households, and 1,642 families in the CDP. The population density was 344.9/km^{2} (892.7/mi^{2}). There were 3,104 housing units at an average density of 198.4/km^{2} (513.6/mi^{2}). The racial makeup of the CDP was 98.46% White, 0.26% African American, 0.17% Native American, 0.32% Asian, 0.02% Pacific Islander, 0.19% from other races, and 0.59% from two or more races. Hispanic or Latino people of any race were 0.70%.

Of the 2,546 households 17.0% had children under the age of 18 living with them, 56.2% were married couples living together, 6.8% had a female householder with no husband present, and 35.5% were non-families. 30.8% of households were one person and 19.8% were one person aged 65 or older. The average household size was 2.11 and the average family size was 2.61.

The age distribution was 15.8% under the age of 18, 3.0% from 18 to 24, 18.7% from 25 to 44, 27.9% from 45 to 64, and 34.7% 65 or older. The median age was 53 years. For every 100 females, there were 85.9 males. For every 100 females age 18 and over, there were 80.7 males.

The median household income was $47,576 and the median family income was $57,841. Males had a median income of $41,029 versus $30,171 for females. The per capita income for the CDP was $30,418. About 2.2% of families and 4.3% of the population were below the poverty line, including 6.2% of those under age 18 and 1.3% of those age 65 or over.

== Notable person ==
- Edward Gorey (1925–2000), artist and writer

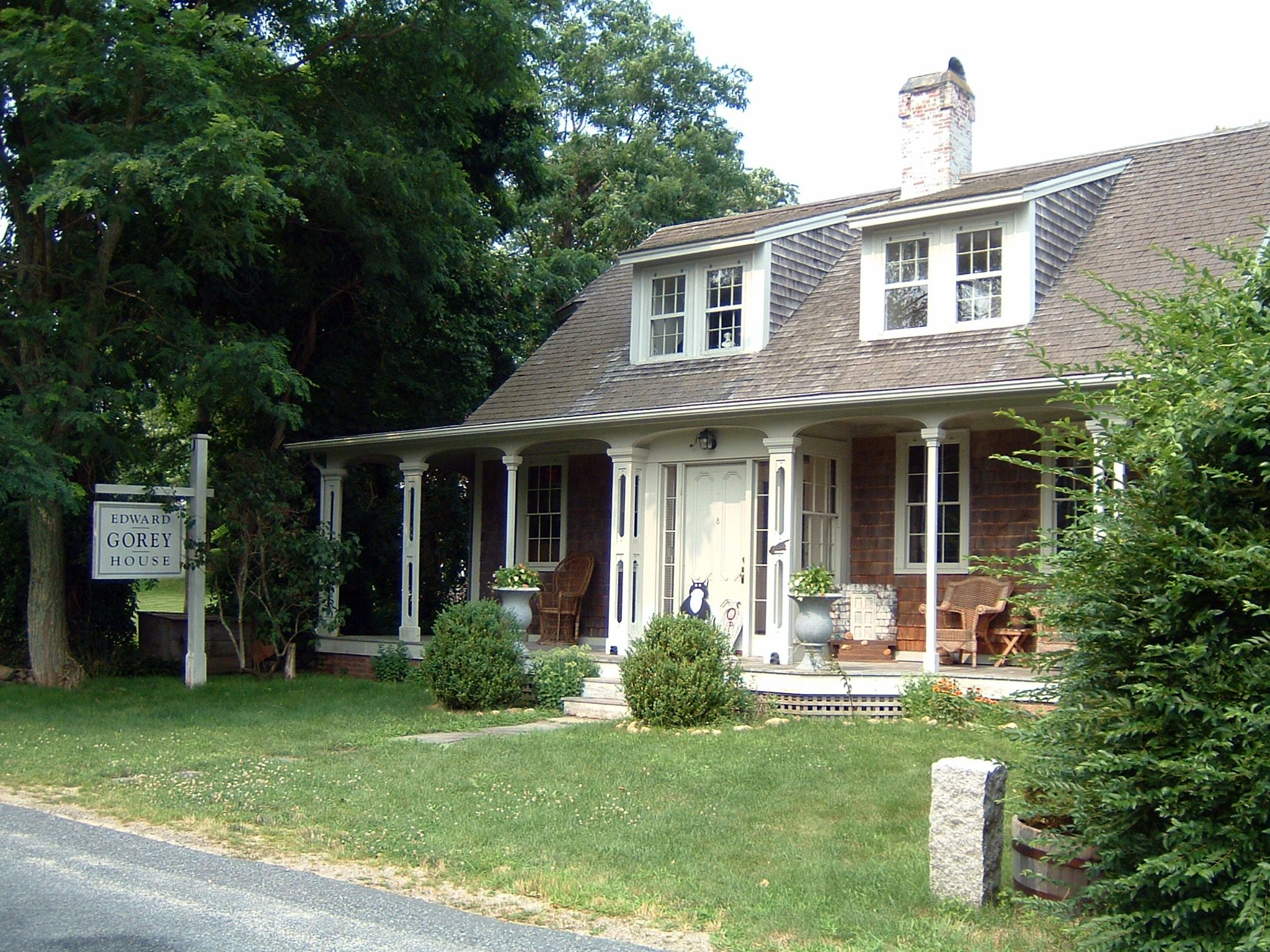
Elephant House, Edward Gorey's home on Cape Cod (2006)
