= Yarmouth, Massachusetts =

- Town
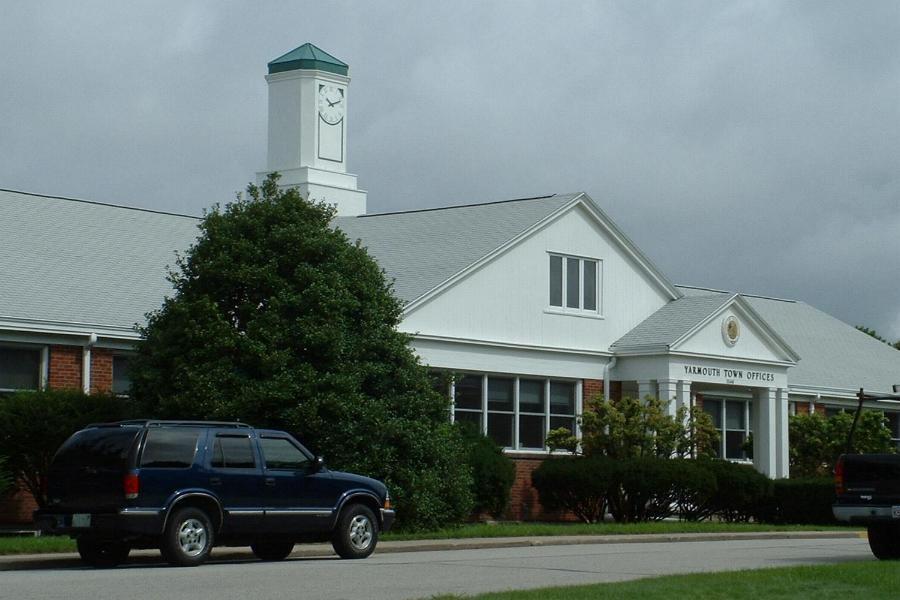
- Yarmouth Town Offices

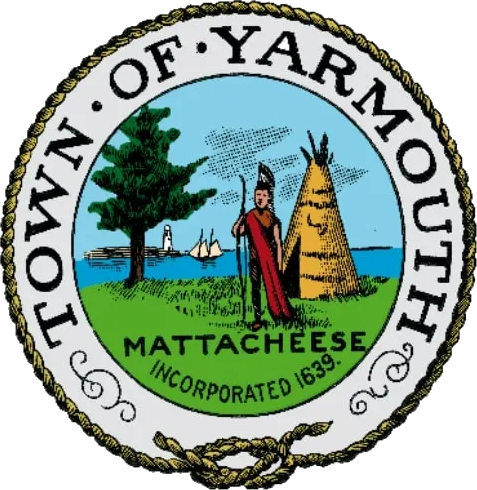
- Seal

- Location in Barnstable County and the state of Massachusetts.
- Coordinates: 41°42′N 70°14′W
- Country: United States
- State: Massachusetts
- County: Barnstable
- Settled: 1639
- Incorporated: September 3, 1639
- Named after: Great Yarmouth, Norfolk

Government
  - Type: Open town meeting
  - Town Administrator: Robert Whritenour

Area
  - Total: 28.2 sq mi (73.1 km^{2})
  - Land: 24.1 sq mi (62.5 km^{2})
  - Water: 4.1 sq mi (10.5 km^{2})
- Elevation: 30 ft (9 m)

Population (2010)
  - Total: 23,793
  - Density: 985/sq mi (380.4/km^{2})
- Time zone: UTC−5 (Eastern)
  - Summer (DST): UTC−4 (Eastern)
- ZIP Codes: 02664 (South Yarmouth); 02673 (West Yarmouth); 02675 (Yarmouth Port)
- Area codes: 508/774
- FIPS code: 25-82525
- GNIS feature ID: 0618262
- Website: www.yarmouth.ma.us

Yarmouth (/ˈjɑːrməθ/ YAR-məth) is a town on Cape Cod in Massachusetts, United States. The population was 25,023 at the 2020 census.

The town is made up of three major villages: South Yarmouth, West Yarmouth, and Yarmouth Port.

== History ==
=== Wampanoag origins ===
Prior to European settlement, Yarmouth was inhabited by the Wampanoag, an Algonquian people. In the Wôpanâak language the area was called "Mattacheese". Wampanoag tribes living in Yarmouth at the time of European settlement included the Pawkunnawkuts on both sides of the lower Bass River, the Hokanums in what is now northeastern Yarmouth, and the Cummaquids in what is now western Yarmouth.

=== Plymouth Colony settlement ===
Yarmouth was organized and incorporated as part of the Plymouth Colony on September 3, 1639, following a settlement led by John Crowe (later Crowell), Thomas Howes and Anthony Thacher, and is, together with Sandwich, the oldest town on Cape Cod. Yarmouth originally included what is now the town of Dennis, which was incorporated as a separate community on June 19, 1793.

Yarmouth is named after Great Yarmouth, a town in the county of Norfolk, on the east coast of England, which is itself at the mouth of the River Yare. Though none of the initial settlers hailed from that English town, the name was possibly chosen because across the North Sea from Yarmouth is the Netherlands, where a portion of the Mayflower passengers had lived in exile. This group of pilgrims arrived back in England via the port of Yarmouth before heading to the New World.

In 1642 and 1645, Yarmouth furnished soldiers for the Plymouth Colony's expeditions against the Narragansett. In 1648, the Plymouth Colony's legislature, the General Court, appointed Myles Standish to adjudicate land disputes among the Yarmouth settlers. Yarmouth soldiers served the Plymouth Colony in King Philip's War: fifteen Yarmouth men participated in the Great Swamp Fight without casualties, but the town did lose five men at Rehoboth. Yarmouth troops also saw service in the early years of King William's War. In the early eighteenth century, some of the Yarmouth veterans of King Philip's War were granted lands to settle in Gorham, Maine.

=== American Revolution ===
Yarmouth was the site of an active group of the Sons of Liberty during the American Revolution. The town's militia mustered to provide assistance to the minutemen at the Battles of Lexington and Concord, but the militia returned home upon news that the rebels had already triumphed on the field. In March 1776, Yarmouth troops served as part of George Washington's forces during the Fortification of Dorchester Heights. A meeting of Yarmouth citizens declared the town's independence from Great Britain on June 20, 1776. As a coastal community, Yarmouth was subject to blockade by the Royal Navy throughout the Revolutionary War.

=== War of 1812 ===
In the early years of the Republic, Yarmouth shared with the rest of New England a strong support for the Federalist Party. The economy of Yarmouth was centered on maritime industries, and the townspeople were consequently opposed to the Jefferson Administration's Embargo Act of 1807 and Non-Intercourse Act of 1809.

On July 8, 1812, the Yarmouth town meeting voted to protest the recent Congressional declaration of war with Great Britain. Along with much of the rest of coastal New England, Yarmouth was subject to blockade by the Royal Navy beginning in 1814. Although the people of Yarmouth, including its militiamen, remained intensely opposed to the War of 1812, local militia forces did participate in attempts to counter the blockade.

=== Early economic endeavors ===
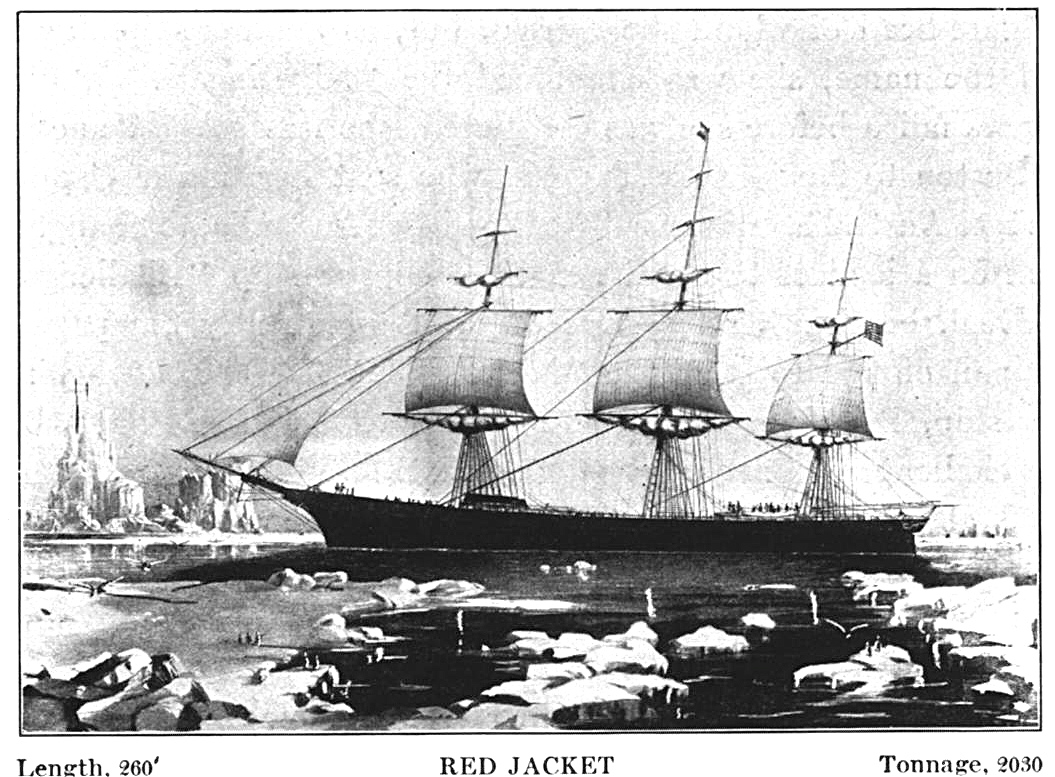
The clipper Red Jacket

Yarmouth began as a farming community in which the people of the town raised pigs, cattle, and sheep. Due to livestock pasturage, firewood collection, shipbuilding, and the construction of the Old Colony Railroad, the old-growth forests of the Wampanoag era had disappeared from Yarmouth by the end of the nineteenth century, not to be replaced with stands of incipient second-growth forest until agriculture declined in the town during the twentieth century.

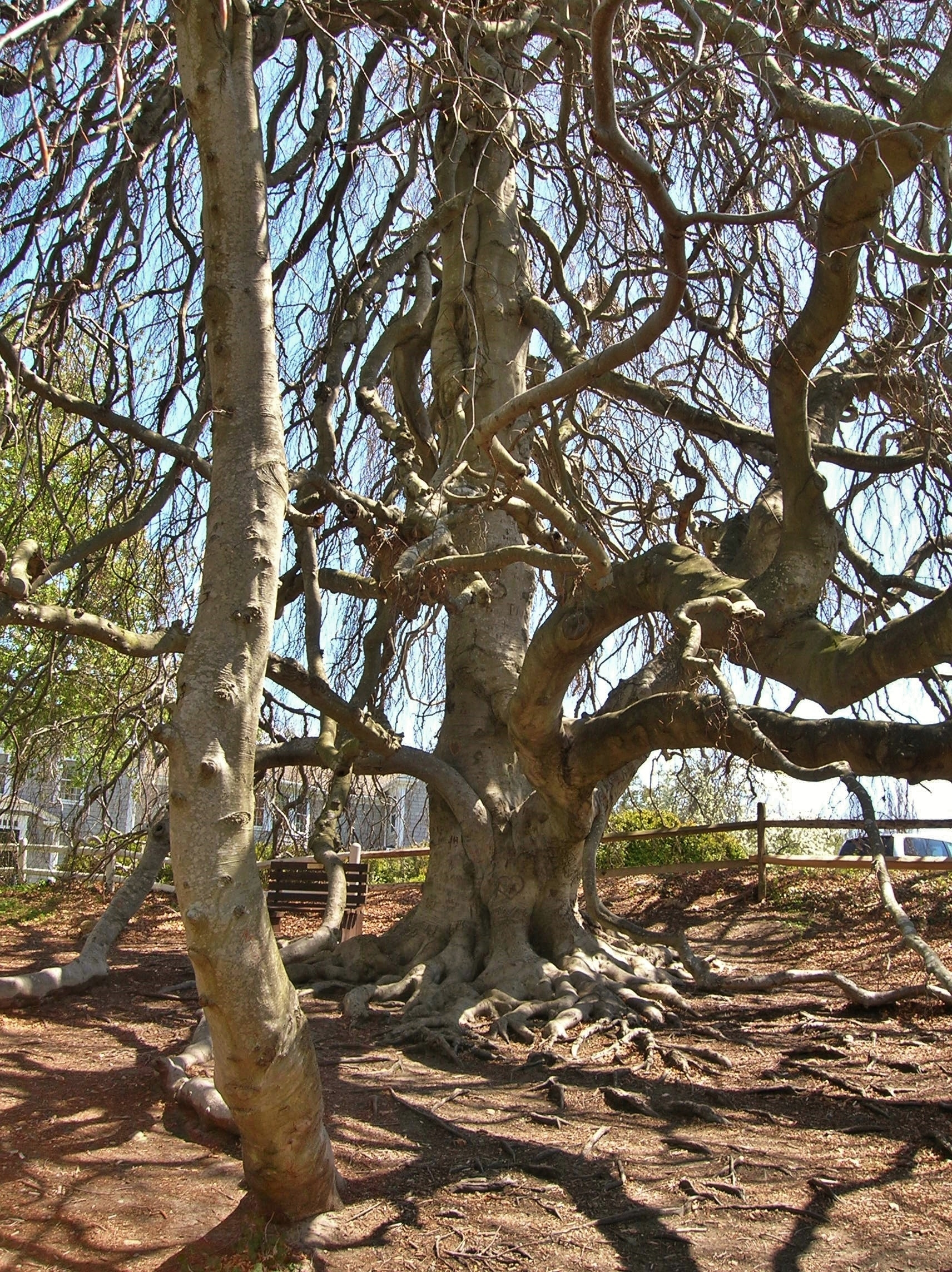
Weeping European Beech

Although agriculture was a prominent part of Yarmouth life, the town's location led its people to make much of their living from the ocean. For centuries, many Yarmouth men worked as whalers. In the early nineteenth century, merchantmen skippered by Yarmouth captains participated in the China Trade between New England and the Cantonese trading center of Whampoa. Captain Ebenezer Sears of Yarmouth was the first American skipper to take a merchant vessel around the Cape of Good Hope. In 1854, Captain Asa Eldridge of Yarmouth skippered the clipper Red Jacket, a packet ship, between New York and Liverpool in only 13 days, 1 hour, and 25 minutes, dock to dock, setting a speed record for fastest trans-Atlantic crossing by a commercial sailing vessel that has remained unbroken ever since. In 1856, Captain Eldridge skippered the ill-fated steamship SS Pacific, which disappeared at sea on a voyage from Liverpool to New York. The house of another Yarmouth sea captain, Captain Bangs Hallet, is now a museum and home to the Historical Society of Old Yarmouth.

=== Contemporary Yarmouth ===
Developers began to refashion Yarmouth into a summer resort near the end of the nineteenth century. Hotels and summer cottage communities proliferated in the first half of the twentieth century, particularly along what is now Route 28. With the emergence of the car culture in the years just after World War II, these were joined first by many motels (mostly along Route 28 in West Yarmouth) and later by the denser, suburban pattern of residential housing construction that characterizes Yarmouth today.

The headquarters of the International Fund for Animal Welfare (IFAW), a global animal welfare and conservation charity founded in 1969, is located in Yarmouth Port. In 1970, the national Christmas Tree Shops retail chain was founded at a location on Route 6A in Yarmouth Port.

On August 26, 2003, Colgan Air Flight 9446 crashed into the water just off of Yarmouth, killing both crew members on board.

== Geography ==
According to the United States Census Bureau, the town has a total area of 28.2 square miles (73.1 km^{2}), of which 24.1 square miles (62.5 km^{2}) is land and 4.1 square miles (10.5 km^{2}), or 14.40%, is water. Yarmouth is bordered by Cape Cod Bay to the north, Dennis to the east, Nantucket Sound to the south, and Barnstable to the west. Yarmouth is approximately 75 miles (121 km) southeast of Boston.

The Bass River and its tributaries make up the majority of the town's border with Dennis. There are also several smaller ponds throughout the town. The Cape Cod Bay shore is marshy, with several creeks flowing into it. The town's southern shore is known for its beaches, from the west jetty of the Bass River to Great Island, on the east and south sides of Hyannis Harbor. The town has no state forests or wildlife management areas, although there are many such natural, unprotected areas in town. The town is also the site of four golf courses, a rod and gun club, and a Boy Scout camp.

=== Climate ===
According to the Köppen climate classification system, Yarmouth, Massachusetts has a warm-summer, wet all year, humid continental climate (Dfb). Dfb climates are characterized by at least one month having an average mean temperature ≤ 32.0 °F (≤ 0.0 °C), at least four months with an average mean temperature ≥ 50.0 °F (≥ 10.0 °C), all months with an average mean temperature ≤ 71.6 °F (≤ 22.0 °C), and no significant precipitation difference between seasons. The average seasonal (Nov–Apr) snowfall total is around 30 in (76 cm). The average snowiest month is February which corresponds with the annual peak in nor'easter activity. According to the United States Department of Agriculture, the plant hardiness zone is 7a with an average annual extreme minimum air temperature of 0.6 °F (−17.4 °C).

Climate data for Yarmouth, Barnstable County, Massachusetts (1981–2010 averages)
Month	Jan	Feb	Mar	Apr	May	Jun	Jul	Aug	Sep	Oct	Nov	Dec	Year
Mean daily maximum °F (°C)	37.9 (3.3)	39.4 (4.1)	44.5 (6.9)	52.9 (11.6)	62.5 (16.9)	71.7 (22.1)	77.9 (25.5)	77.3 (25.2)	71.0 (21.7)	61.3 (16.3)	52.9 (11.6)	43.4 (6.3)	57.8 (14.3)
Daily mean °F (°C)	30.6 (−0.8)	32.0 (0.0)	37.3 (2.9)	45.6 (7.6)	54.9 (12.7)	64.4 (18.0)	70.6 (21.4)	70.1 (21.2)	63.5 (17.5)	53.8 (12.1)	45.6 (7.6)	36.2 (2.3)	50.5 (10.3)
Mean daily minimum °F (°C)	23.3 (−4.8)	24.7 (−4.1)	30.1 (−1.1)	38.2 (3.4)	47.3 (8.5)	57.0 (13.9)	63.3 (17.4)	62.9 (17.2)	56.1 (13.4)	46.2 (7.9)	38.3 (3.5)	29.0 (−1.7)	43.1 (6.2)
Average precipitation inches (mm)	3.63 (92)	3.22 (82)	4.45 (113)	4.24 (108)	3.31 (84)	3.44 (87)	3.09 (78)	3.35 (85)	3.62 (92)	3.95 (100)	3.97 (101)	4.02 (102)	44.29 (1,125)
Average relative humidity (%)	70.4	69.3	67.7	70.6	73.0	75.8	78.3	78.2	77.9	74.3	71.2	70.7	73.1
Average dew point °F (°C)	22.1 (−5.5)	23.1 (−4.9)	27.6 (−2.4)	36.6 (2.6)	46.4 (8.0)	56.6 (13.7)	63.5 (17.5)	63.0 (17.2)	56.5 (13.6)	45.8 (7.7)	36.8 (2.7)	27.6 (−2.4)	42.2 (5.7)
Source: PRISM Climate Group

== Ecology ==
According to the A. W. Kuchler U.S. Potential natural vegetation Types, Yarmouth, Massachusetts would primarily contain a Northeastern Oak/Pine (110) vegetation type with a Southern Mixed Forest (26) vegetation form.

== Transportation ==
Cape Cod's three major east–west routes, U.S. Route 6, Massachusetts Route 6A and Massachusetts Route 28, all run through the town. Unlike many towns on the Cape, there are no other state routes crossing between the three roads, with all crossing routes being local roads. There are two exits off Route 6 (also known as the Mid-Cape Highway) in town.

Freight rail service is provided by the Massachusetts Coastal Railroad from the Barnstable town line to just west of Station Avenue south of U.S. Route 6, where a trash transfer station is located. Trash is loaded onto rail cars at the transfer station and hauled to the SEMASS waste-to-energy plant in Rochester. A portion of the Hyannis branch also passes through the western part of Yarmouth. From the nearby Hyannis station, the Cape Cod Central Railroad operates seasonal tourist excursions to Sandwich and Buzzards Bay, and the MBTA's CapeFLYER service offers seasonal weekend service to Boston, with stops in Bourne, Buzzards Bay, Wareham, and several commuter rail stations. The nearest inter-city (Amtrak) passenger rail stations are Boston's South Station and Providence. The nearest MBTA Commuter Rail stations are Kingston and Middleborough.

There are also several bike paths throughout town.

The nearest airport is the Barnstable Municipal Airport, just over the town line. The nearest national and international air service is at Logan International Airport in Boston.

== Demographics ==
Historical population
Year	Pop.	±%
1790	2,678	—
1850	2,595	−3.1%
1860	2,752	+6.1%
1870	2,423	−12.0%
1880	2,173	−10.3%
1890	1,760	−19.0%
1900	1,682	−4.4%
1910	1,420	−15.6%
1920	1,229	−13.5%
1930	1,794	+46.0%
1940	2,286	+27.4%
1950	3,297	+44.2%
1960	5,504	+66.9%
1970	12,033	+118.6%
1980	18,449	+53.3%
1990	21,174	+14.8%
2000	24,807	+17.2%
2010	23,793	−4.1%
2020	25,023	+5.2%
2024*	25,208	+0.7%
* = population estimate. Source: United States census records and Population Estimates Program data.

As of the census of 2020, there were 25,091 people and 11,699 households residing in the town. The population density was 1,038.7 inhabitants per square mile (401.0/km^{2}). There were 17,550 housing units at an average density of 684.8 per square mile (264.4/km^{2}). The racial makeup of the town was 82.1% White, 4.1% African American, 0% Native American, 2.5% Asian, 0% Pacific Islander, 3.3% from other races, and 7.9% from two or more races. Hispanic or Latino of any race were 3.3% of the population.

There were 11,699 households, out of which 60% were married couples living together, 13% had a female householder with no husband present, 5% had a male householder with no wife present, and 22% were non-families. The average household size was 2.1.

In the town, the population was spread out, with 14% under the age of 18, 61% from 18 to 64, and 35% who were 65 years of age or older. The median age was 55.5 years. The town is 53% female and 47% male.

The median income for a household in the town was $89,985, and the median income. The per capita income for the town was $53,973. About 7.7% of the population were below the poverty line, including 8% of those under age 18 and 7% of those age 65 or over.

== Government ==
Yarmouth is represented in the Massachusetts House of Representatives as a part of the First and Second Barnstable Districts. The town is represented in the Massachusetts Senate as a part of the Cape and Islands Districts, which includes all of Cape Cod, Martha's Vineyard and Nantucket except the towns of Bourne, Falmouth, Sandwich and a portion of Barnstable. The town is home to the Second Barracks of Troop D of the Massachusetts State Police.

On the national level, Yarmouth is a part of Massachusetts's 9th congressional district, and is currently represented by William R. Keating.

Yarmouth is governed by the open town meeting form of government, and is led by a town administrator and a board of selectmen. There is a central police station, and one firehouse, post office and library each in South Yarmouth, West Yarmouth and Yarmouth Port.

Yarmouth presidential election results
Year	Democratic	Republican	Third parties	Total Votes	Difference
2020	59.21% 9,149	38.78% 5,993	2.01% 310	15,452	20.42%
2016	52.63% 7,304	42.14% 5,848	5.24% 727	13,879	10.49%
2012	51.72% 7,198	47.00% 6,541	1.28% 178	13,917	4.72%
2008	53.90% 7,547	44.18% 6,187	1.92% 269	14,003	9.71%
2004	53.44% 7,652	45.60% 6,529	0.96% 138	14,319	7.84%
2000	50.95% 6,881	42.94% 5,799	6.11% 825	13,505	8.01%
1996	52.36% 6,601	38.52% 4,856	9.11% 1,149	12,606	13.84%
1992	41.88% 5,168	34.71% 4,283	23.42% 2,890	12,341	7.17%
1988	45.57% 5,340	52.88% 6,197	1.55% 182	11,719	7.31%
1984	40.48% 4,576	59.26% 6,699	0.26% 29	11,304	18.78%
1980	26.93% 2,891	55.52% 5,961	17.56% 1,885	10,737	28.59%
1976	39.33% 3,770	56.91% 5,455	3.77% 361	9,586	17.58%
1972	33.96% 2,952	65.54% 5,697	0.51% 44	8,693	31.58%
1968	36.64% 1,996	60.79% 3,312	2.57% 140	5,448	24.16%
1964	52.90% 2,079	46.74% 1,837	0.36% 14	3,930	6.16%
1960	32.53% 1,080	67.41% 2,238	0.06% 2	3,320	34.88%
1956	14.12% 349	85.76% 2,120	0.12% 3	2,472	71.64%
1952	12.03% 243	87.77% 1,773	0.20% 4	2,020	75.74%
1948	16.27% 212	82.66% 1,077	1.07% 14	1,303	66.39%
1944	20.34% 216	79.38% 843	0.28% 3	1,062	59.04%
1940	22.20% 270	77.55% 943	0.25% 3	1,216	55.35%

== Education ==
Yarmouth schools make up one-half of the Dennis-Yarmouth Regional School District. Yarmouth operates two elementary schools (Station Avenue and Marguerite E. Small) which serve students from pre-kindergarten through grade 5, and the Dennis-Yarmouth Intermediate/Middle School, which serves grades 4 through 7. In 2022, Mattacheese Middle School in Yarmouth and the Wixon School in Dennis were consolidated into the newly constructed Dennis-Yarmouth Intermediate/Middle School.

The town is the home to Dennis-Yarmouth Regional High School, where both towns send their grade 8–12 students. (Unlike most high schools, which are 9–12) Their team colors are green and white, and their mascot is the dolphin.

Students who live in Yarmouth may also attend Cape Cod Regional Technical High School in Harwich or Sturgis Charter Public School in Hyannis; both for grades 9–12. In addition, they may choose to attend Saint Pius X School for grades pre-kindergarten through 8, or any of the other private schools in neighboring Barnstable.

== Sports and recreation ==
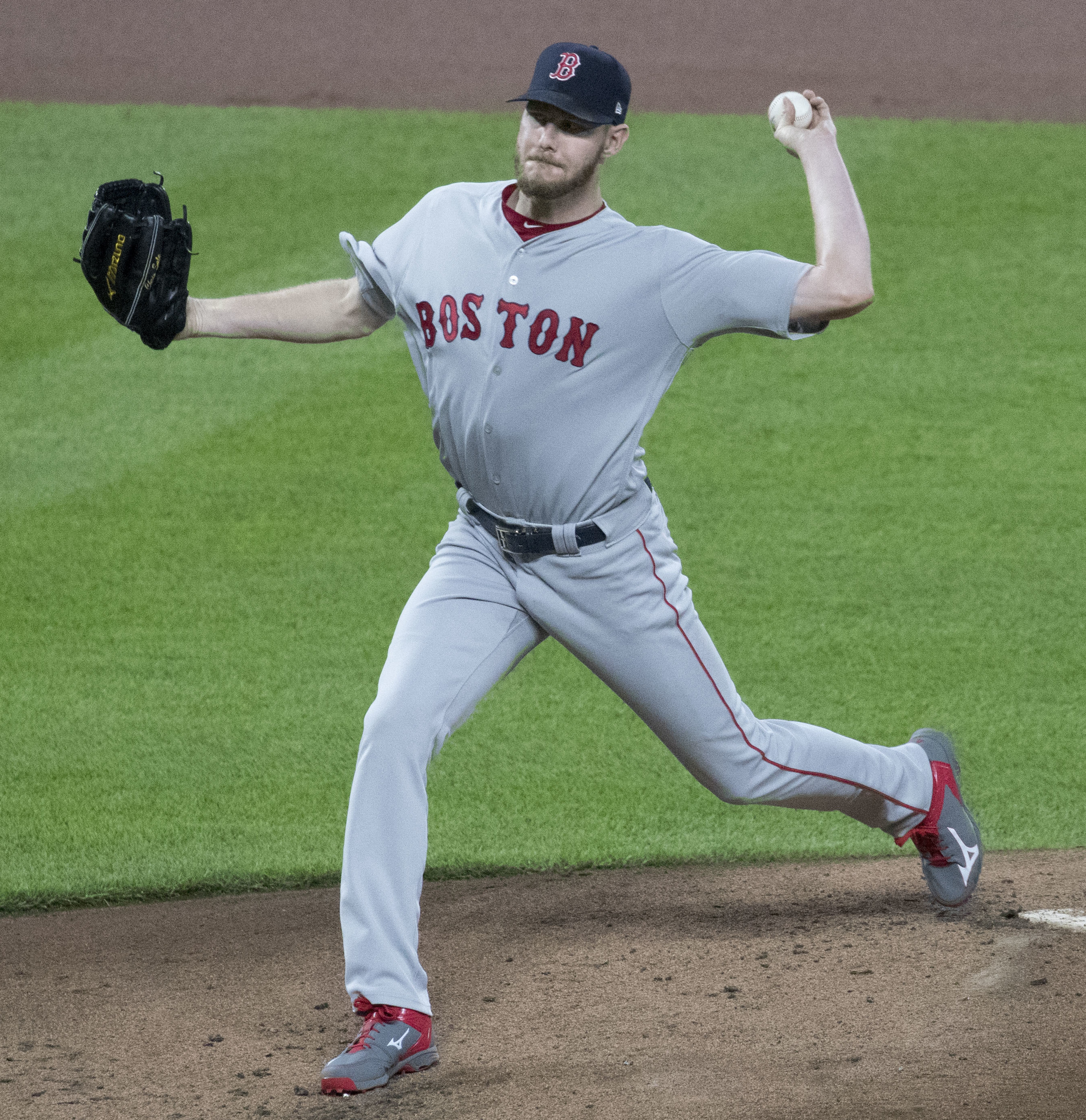
Chris Sale played for the Yarmouth–Dennis Red Sox in 2009.

Yarmouth is home to the Yarmouth–Dennis Red Sox, an amateur collegiate summer baseball team in the Cape Cod Baseball League. The team plays at Red Wilson Field and has featured dozens of players who went on to careers in Major League Baseball such as Craig Biggio, Buster Posey, and Chris Sale.

== Notable people ==
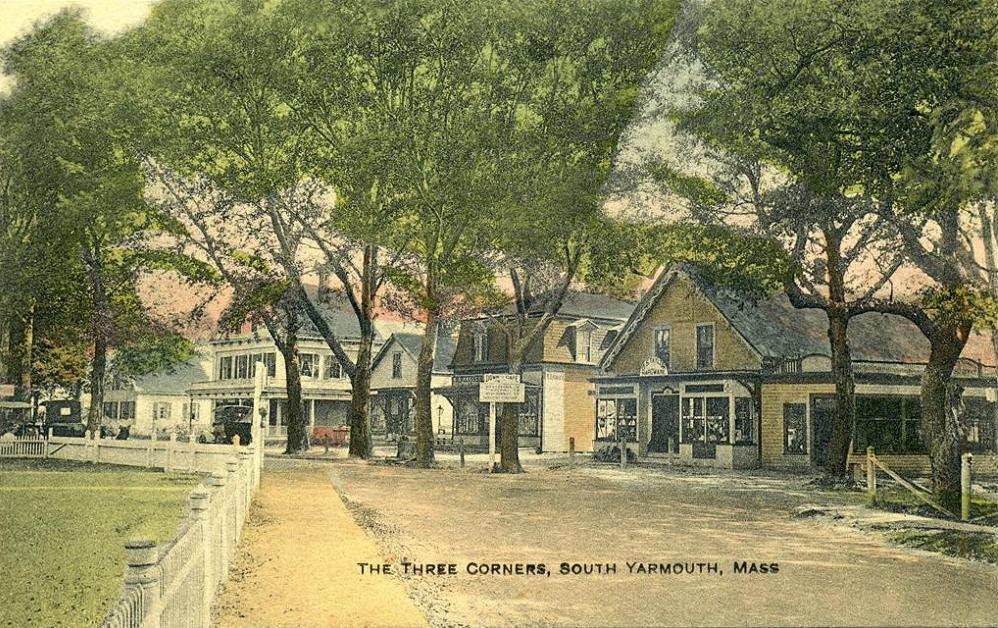
The Three Corners in South Yarmouth c. 1910

- Asa Eldridge, sea captain
- Edward Gorey, writer and illustrator
- John Gorham, decorated colonial Ranger
- Lot Hall, Justice of the Vermont Supreme Court
- Joseph Eldridge Hamblin, Civil War major general
- Christy Mihos, businessman and politician
- Snow Parker, merchant, judge and politician
- Keith Reed, Major League Baseball outfielder
- Joe Sherman, Major League Baseball pitcher
- Thomas Chandler Thacher, congressman
- George Thatcher, lawyer and statesman

== See also ==
- Taylor-Bray Farm
