= Jimmy Herron =

American baseball player (born 1996)

Free agent
- Outfielder
- Born: July 27, 1996 (age 29); Harleysville, Pennsylvania, U.S.
- Bats: Right Throws: Right

James P. Herron (born July 27, 1996) is an American professional baseball outfielder who is a free agent.

== Amateur career ==
Herron was born and grew up in Harleysville, Pennsylvania and attended La Salle College High School, where he played baseball and football. Over four seasons, he batted .379 with 102 hits, 102 runs scored, and 67 RBIs. In football, Herron was a three time All-Philadelphia Catholic League selection at wide receiver and set a Philadelphia high school record for career touchdown receptions. He committed to play college baseball at Duke University over offers from Notre Dame and Nebraska.

Herron played college baseball for the Duke Blue Devils for three seasons. He was named a Freshman All-American by Louisville Slugger and second-team All-Atlantic Coast Conference (ACC) as a freshman after batting .324 with 22 doubles, 35 runs scored, and 24 stolen bases. After the 2016 season, Herron played collegiate summer baseball with the Bourne Braves of the Cape Cod Baseball League. He was named first-team All-ACC during his sophomore season after he hit .326 with 17 doubles, five home runs, 39 RBIs, and 53 runs scored. Herron was selected in the 31st round of the 2017 MLB draft by the New York Yankees, but did not sign with the team. He returned to the Cape Cod League in the summer of 2017 and played for the Orleans Firebirds, where he was named the East Division MVP of the league's all-star game. He was named second-team All-ACC as a junior.

== Professional career ==
=== Chicago Cubs ===
Herron was selected in the third round (98th overall) of the 2018 Major League Baseball draft by the Chicago Cubs. He signed with the team on June 22, 2018, and received a $520,000 signing bonus. Herron was assigned to the Myrtle Beach Pelicans of the High-A Carolina League at the beginning of the 2019 season.

=== Colorado Rockies ===
Herron was traded to the Colorado Rockies in exchange for international bonus pool money on July 31, 2019. The Rockies assigned him to the Lancaster JetHawks of the California League, where he batter .338 with four home runs and 13 RBI over 18 games. Herron did not play in a game in 2020 due to the cancelation of the minor league season because of the COVID-19 pandemic.

Herron was assigned to the Double-A Hartford Yard Goats during the 2021 season, but played in only five games due to injury. Herron returned to the Yard Goats at the start of the 2022 season. He was promoted to the Triple-A Albuquerque Isotopes after 54 games.

Herron made 128 appearances for Albuquerque in 2023, slashing .296/.395/.498 with 19 home runs, 83 RBI, and 33 stolen bases. He returned to the Isotopes in 2024, making 95 appearances and batting .280/.357/.453 with 14 home runs, 68 RBI, and 16 stolen bases. Herron elected free agency following the season on November 4, 2024.

=== Milwaukee Brewers ===
Herron a signed a minor league contract with the Milwaukee Brewers organization that included an invitation to spring training on November 15, 2024. He made 78 appearances for the Triple-A Nashville Sounds in 2025, batting .219/.297/.287 with three home runs, 23 RBI, and 18 stolen bases. Herron elected free agency following the season on November 6, 2025.
