= Orleans Firebirds =

Collegiate summer baseball team in Massachusetts

Information
- League: Cape Cod Baseball League (East Division)
- Location: Orleans, Massachusetts
- Ballpark: Eldredge Park
- League championships: 1947, 1949, 1950, 1952, 1953, 1955, 1957, 1986, 1993, 2003, 2005
- Former name: Orleans Cardinals; Orleans Red Sox; Orleans Sparklers
- President: Bob O'Donnell
- General manager: Sue Horton
- Manager: Kelly Nicholson
- Website: www.capecodleague.com/orleans/

The Orleans Firebirds, formerly the Orleans Cardinals, are a collegiate summer baseball team based in Orleans, Massachusetts. The team is a member of the Cape Cod Baseball League (CCBL) and plays in the league's East Division. The Firebirds play their home games at Eldredge Park in Orleans, which opened in 1913 and is the CCBL's oldest ballpark. The Firebirds are owned and operated by the non-profit Orleans Athletic Association.

Orleans has won two CCBL championships in the 21st century, most recently in 2005 when they defeated the Bourne Braves two games to one to win the best of three championship series. The team was a dominant force in the CCBL during the 11-season span from 1947 to 1957 in which Orleans claimed seven league titles. Since the club's inception, over 100 players have gone on to play in Major League Baseball.

== History ==
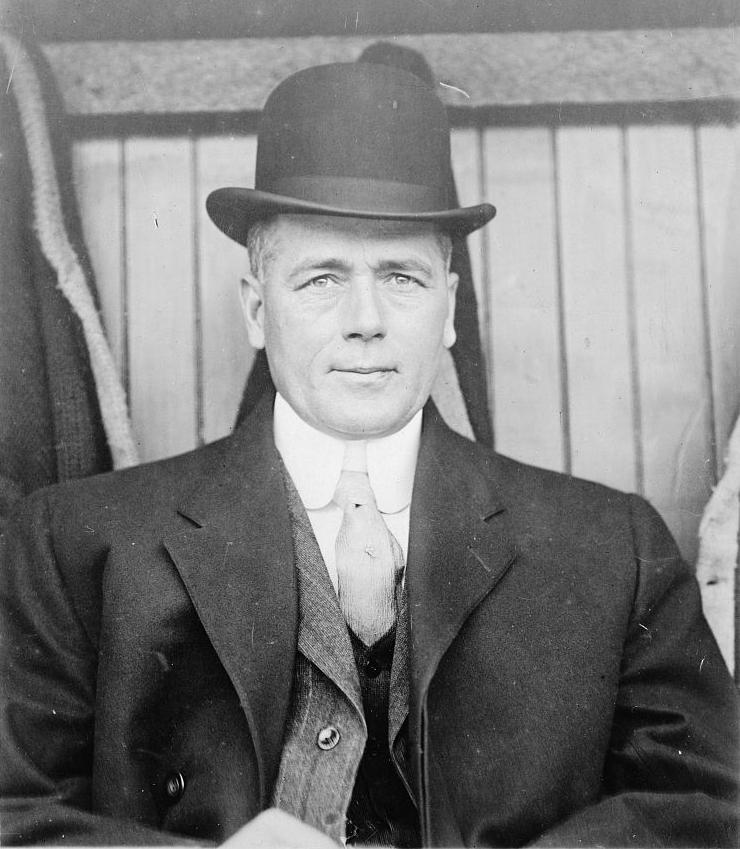
Longtime major league player and former Boston Red Sox manager Patsy Donovan skippered Orleans in 1929 and 1930.

=== Pre-modern era ===
==== Early years ====
Baseball in Orleans has been played at Eldredge Park since 1913, when the land for the park was donated to the town by baseball enthusiast Louis Winslow "Win" Eldredge, "in consideration of [his] affection for and interest in the young people of Orleans and [his] desire to provide a playground for them."

==== The early Cape League era (1923–1939) ====
In 1923 the Cape Cod Baseball League was formed and included four teams: Falmouth, Chatham, Osterville, and Hyannis. This early Cape League operated through the 1939 season and disbanded in 1940, due in large part to the difficulty of securing ongoing funding during the Great Depression. Orleans' entry into the league came in 1928. Wareham had been added in 1927 to bring the number of teams to five, and Orleans and Plymouth were to be added in 1928, though the Plymouth entry never materialized.

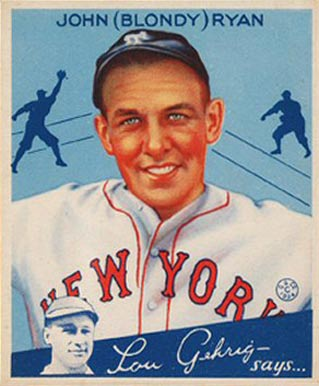
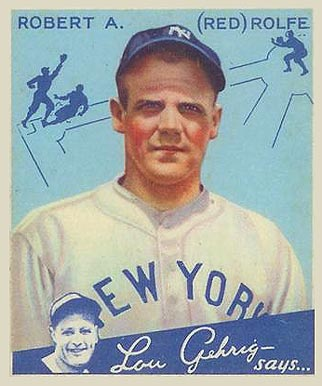
Blondy Ryan and Red Rolfe played for Orleans during the early Cape League era. Both went on to enjoy long major league careers. Ryan was starting shortstop for the 1933 World Series champion New York Giants, and Rolfe was starting third basemen for five New York Yankees World Series championship teams.

Orleans featured several notable figures during this era. Lynn, Massachusetts native John "Blondy" Ryan played for Orleans in 1928 and went on to play for the World Series-winning 1933 New York Giants. New Hampshire native Red Rolfe played for Orleans in 1930 and went on to be the starting third-baseman for the New York Yankees of the late 1930s. Rolfe was a four-time American League all-star, and won five World Series titles with the Bronx Bombers. While at Orleans, Rolfe played for skipper Patsy Donovan, a longtime major league player and manager who had managed the Boston Red Sox in 1910 and 1911, and who piloted the Orleans team in 1929 and 1930. Al Weston and Ed Wineapple played for Orleans in 1931. Weston was a former Boston College star who had played with the major league Boston Braves in 1929, and Wineapple a 1929 Washington Senator who had played for Osterville in the CCBL for three years previously. Lawrence, Massachusetts native Johnny Broaca played for Orleans from 1930 to 1932, and later pitched for the 1936 World Series champion Yankees.

Orleans withdrew from the league after the 1934 season due to funding issues, but returned in 1937. Massachusetts Governor Charles F. Hurley was on hand to throw out the ceremonial first pitch to open the 1937 season in Orleans as the team faced Harwich. Orleans fielded a team again in 1938, but then was forced to withdraw from the league again for the 1939 season, after which the league itself disbanded.

Orleans' 1938 team featured Danvers, Massachusetts native Connie Creeden, who batted over .400 for the season to lead the league, and who went on to play for the major league Boston Braves. The team's ace pitcher in 1938 was Somerville, Massachusetts native Al Blanche. Blanche was a Cape League veteran who had led Harwich's 1933 title club, then spent two seasons in the majors with the Boston Braves before returning to the Cape League in 1938 to play for Orleans. CCBL Hall of Famer Bill Enos played for Orleans during this period, and went on to be a longtime scout for the Boston Red Sox, as well as the first-ever scouting liaison for the Cape League to Major League Baseball.

==== The Upper and Lower Cape League era (1946–1962) ====
The Cape League reorganized in 1946 after a hiatus during World War II, and Orleans began play in the revived league in 1947. The team was originally known as the Orleans Sparklers, but soon became known as the Orleans Red Sox. Orleans dominated the post-war period, appearing in the CCBL championship series in each of its first nine years in the league, and 11 times total between 1947 and 1959. During this span, the club won seven CCBL titles, including back to back championships in 1949 and 1950, and again in 1952 and 1953.

The club was skippered by Herb Fuller in 1947 and 1948, and featured CCBL Hall of Famers Roy Bruninghaus, a Cape League all-star pitcher for three decades for Orleans who had been playing with the team since the 1930s, and Allen "Buzzy" Wilcox, another three-decade player, who was an infielder for Orleans for 17 years from the 1940s to the 1960s. Orleans won the league title in its inaugural 1947 campaign, defeating the Upper Cape champion Mashpee Warriors in that year's championship series, which was played as a Labor Day home-and-home doubleheader. In Game 1 at Eldredge Park, Orleans got an 11-strikeout performance by Bruninghaus, and slugger Dave Bremner went 5-for-5 with a homer in the 12–7 win. Facing Mashpee's CCBL Hall of Fame ace hurler Donald Hicks in Game 2, Bremner continued his torrid pace, going 4-for-6, but Orleans trailed by two going to the final frame. In the top of the ninth, Orleans exploded for seven runs, then brought in Bruninghaus to close out the 15–10 win and clinch the club's first Cape League crown. Fuller brought the club back to the title series in 1948 for a rematch with Mashpee, but this time Hicks and Mashpee came out on top.

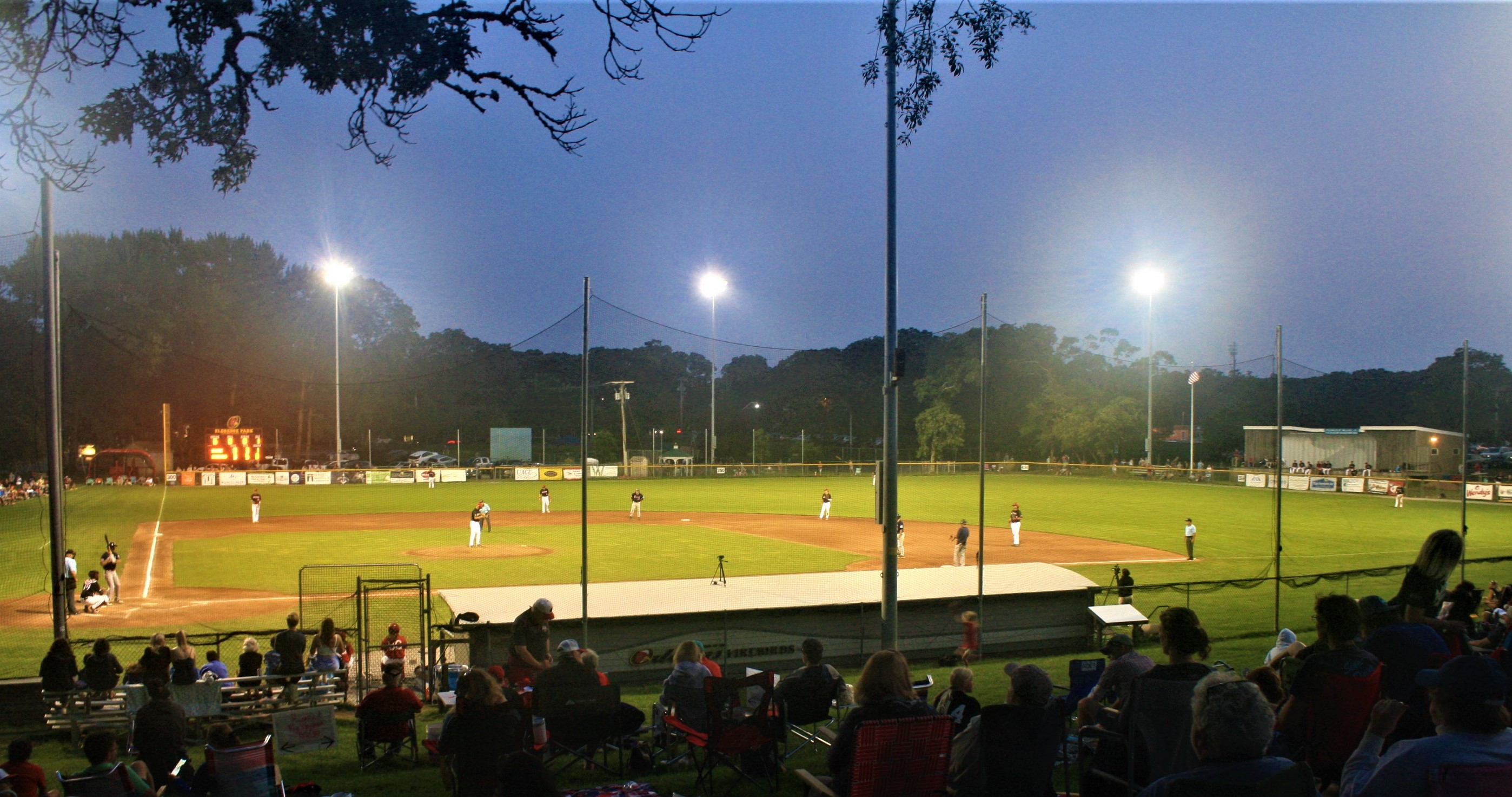
Eldredge Park has been the home of Orleans baseball since 1913.

In 1949, CCBL Hall of Famer Laurin "Pete" Peterson joined the team as catcher/manager and piloted the club for the next 14 years. Peterson's 1949 club finished atop the Lower Cape division and went on to meet Upper Cape champ Falmouth in the best-of-five title series. Orleans took the first two games, winning Game 1 at home, 4–2, then capitalizing on nine Falmouth errors while riding a complete game by Roy Bruninghaus and a 4-for-4 day by Dave Bremner to a 6–2 Game 2 win at Falmouth Heights. After Game 2, Orleans lost the services of stars Bruninghaus and Bremner, who were unavailable for the remainder of the series, and the result was a Game 3 drubbing at Eldredge Park as Falmouth stayed alive by an 11–5 tally. Game 4 was marred by controversy and charges of poor sportsmanship as Orleans brought in Stan Wilcox, who had not played for the club all season, and who had played professionally earlier in the year. Falmouth's defense was again riddled with errors, and Orleans walked away with a 6–1 series-clinching victory.

Orleans was back in the title series in 1950, this time facing Upper Cape champ Sagamore in what became the first of five consecutive championship matchups between the perennial Upper and Lower Cape powerhouses. Orleans seemed ready to sweep the Clouters, taking Game 1, 8–3, and Game 2, 19–9, with Roy Bruninghaus going the distance on the mound for the win in both contests. Sagamore hurler Ricky Anderson almost single-handedly turned the series around as he twirled complete games in both halves of a Labor Day doubleheader, beating Orleans 8–5 in the morning Game 3 at Orleans, and 10–6 in the afternoon Game 4 at Keith Field, and helping his own cause with a 4-for-8 day at the plate. The deciding Game 5 was played at the neutral Ezra Baker Field in Dennis, and Orleans left no doubt, riding back-to-back homers by Buzzy Wilcox and Bob Bremner in the fourth, and a complete game six-hit shutout by Bruninghaus to a championship-clinching 8–0 victory.

Peterson's club was downed by Sagamore in the 1951 CCBL championship, but was back on top the following season. In the 1952 best-of-five Cape League championship series, Orleans swept the Clouters, with pitchers Bruninghaus and Bill McCrae allowing Sagamore only two runs in the series. Orleans took Games 1 and 2 by tallies of 5–1 and 3–1, then sealed the deal with a title-clinching 3–0 Labor Day shutout at Eldredge Park.

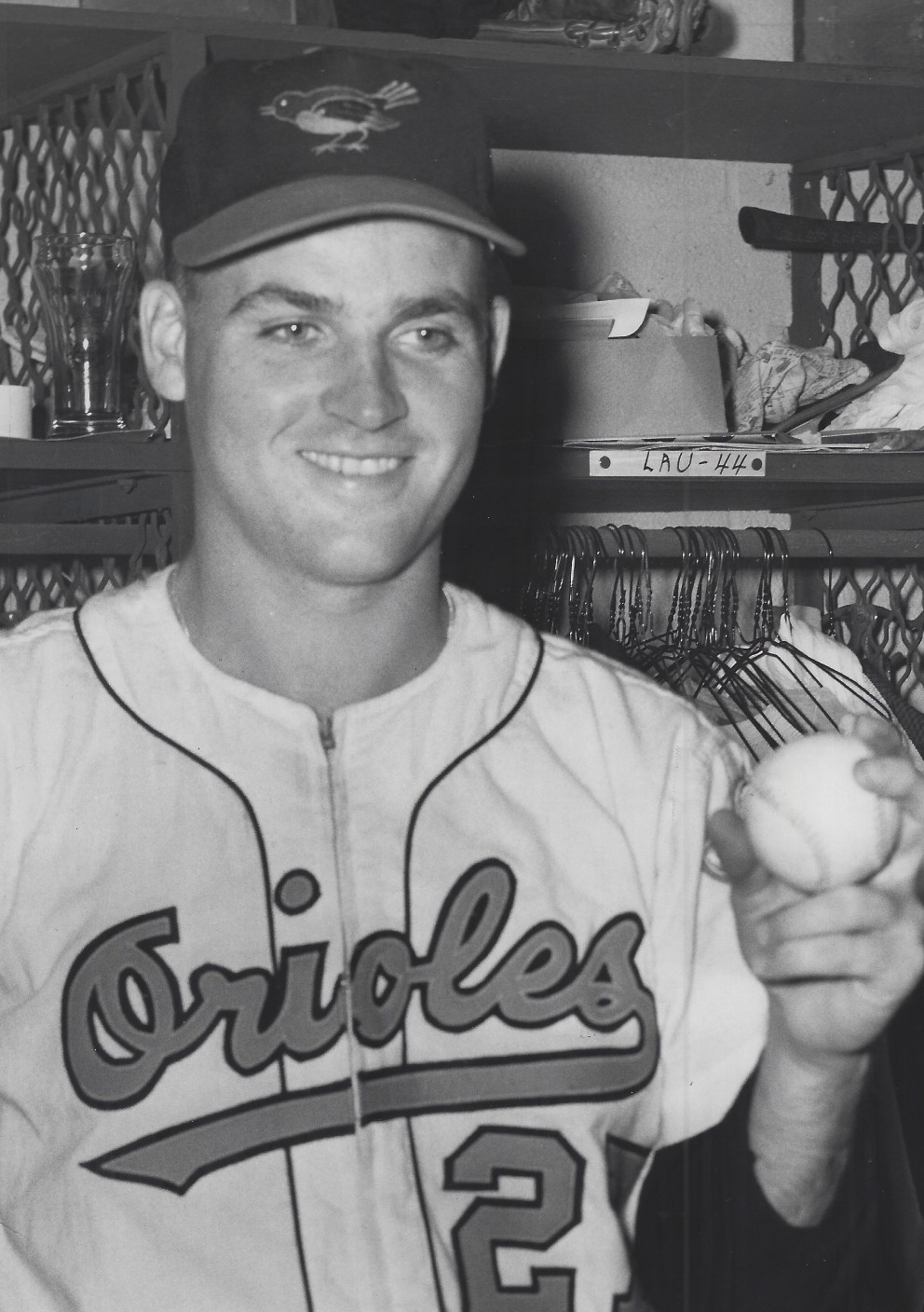
CCBL Hall of Famer Art Quirk was a dominant pitcher and batter for Orleans in 1958.

Orleans repeated as champions in 1953, again sweeping Sagamore in three straight for the title. In Game 1 at Keith Field, Orleans sent Bruninghaus to the mound and gave him ample support, including a three-run homer by Jim Gage in a 13–5 rout. Game 2 at home was another Orleans romp, as hurler Bill McCrae tossed a three-hitter in a 12–1 win. Orleans was down on the road, 6–5, in the eighth inning of Game 3, when Peterson brought in Bruninghaus to relieve starter John Linnell. Bruninghaus escaped the jam, and proceeded to tie the game himself with a homer in the top of the ninth. He went on to no-hit Sagamore for three more innings, while Orleans put the game away with a four-run 11th, capped by Junie Lee's three-run bomb, to take a 10–6 win that completed the repeat championship sweep.

In the teams' fifth consecutive championship series meeting, Orleans bowed to Sagamore in the 1954 title tilt, but Peterson's boys were back to face a new opponent the following season. After playoff series wins over North Truro AFS and Yarmouth to claim the Lower Cape title, Orleans advanced to the 1955 championship round against the Cotuit Kettleers. The series' first two games were played as a home-and-home double header, and in Game 1 at Lowell Park, Orleans bats were on a tear and hurler John Mayo struck out ten in a complete game effort, as Orleans took the series lead with an 11–3 win. In Game 2 at home, Orleans lefty Ray Tucker tossed a four-hitter as the club scratched out a 4–2 victory to take a commanding series lead. Orleans completed the sweep on the road as Tucker posted his second win of the series, fanning 13 Cotuit batters before Roy Bruninghaus relieved him with one out in the ninth, to nail down a 6–3 Orleans win that clinched the title.

For the first time since joining the revived league, Orleans failed to reach the CCBL title series in 1956, but the club was right back in championship form the following season. The 1957 Orleans club was pitted against Upper Cape champ Wareham in the league title series. The Red Sox sent Doug Higgins to the mound in Game 1 and jumped ahead early with four runs in the first and never looked back, routing the Gatemen by a final of 10–1. Orleans completed the two-game sweep before a home crowd in Game 2, getting a homer and a pair of singles from Stan Wilcox on the way to a 5–3 victory that secured the club's seventh CCBL crown in 11 years.

CCBL Hall of Famer Art Quirk posted a remarkable 9–0 record in 1958 with a 1.12 earned run average as a pitcher for Orleans, while also leading the league with a .475 batting average. Quirk went on to play in the majors for the Baltimore Orioles and Washington Senators. In 1959, Orleans reached the CCBL title series for a final time during this era, facing old nemesis Sagamore in a matchup of the two dominant clubs of the period. The Clouters proceeded to shut down Orleans, evening the score at three titles apiece over the adversaries' six title matchups in the decade.

=== Modern era (1963–present) ===
In 1963, the CCBL was reorganized and became officially sanctioned by the NCAA. The league would no longer be characterized by "town teams" who fielded mainly Cape Cod residents, but would now be a formal collegiate league. Teams began to recruit college players and coaches from an increasingly wide geographic radius.

The league was originally composed of ten teams, which were divided into Upper Cape and Lower Cape divisions. The Orleans team was dubbed the Orleans Cardinals, and joined Harwich, Chatham, Yarmouth and a team from Otis Air Force Base in the Lower Cape Division.

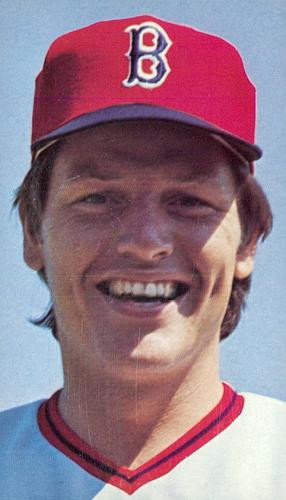
Boston Red Sox legend and Baseball Hall of Famer Carlton Fisk played for Orleans in 1966.

==== The 1960s and 1970s ====
Orleans was skippered in the 1960s by Dave Gavitt, an Orleans pitcher in the late 1950s and later the CEO of the Boston Celtics and member of the Naismith Memorial Basketball Hall of Fame. Gavitt brought Orleans to the league championship series in the 1963 inaugural year of the modern era, but the team fell short against Cotuit. CCBL Hall of Famer Lou Lamoriello played for Orleans in 1963, as did fellow CCBL Hall of Famer Tom Yankus, a three-year league all-star who threw a no-hitter for Orleans on July 4, 1965. Yankus later managed Orleans from 1974 to 1980. The 1965 season also saw CCBL Hall of Famer John Awdycki lead the league with a .407 batting average.

In 1966, University of New Hampshire star Calvin Fisk played first base for Orleans. Near the end of the season, Calvin's younger brother Carlton Fisk joined him in Orleans, and proceeded to belt a homer in his first at-bat for the Cardinals. Though the younger Fisk played in only a handful of games for the Cardinals, he made a lasting impression. Carlton was drafted in 1967 by the hometown Boston Red Sox, where he was a perennial all-star throughout the 1970s In 2000, he was inducted into the National Baseball Hall of Fame in Cooperstown, New York.

In 1967, the CCBL All-Star Game was held at Eldredge Park, and the Cardinals' own Chuck Seelbach emerged as the winning pitcher. Seelbach also tossed a no-hitter that season at Eldredge Park against a Chatham team that featured future major league star Thurman Munson. The 1968 Orleans team featured CCBL Hall of Famer Phil Corddry, who went 9–2 with 108 strikeouts in 92 innings for the Cardinals to win the league's Outstanding Pitcher Award. Another future CCBL Hall of Famer, Jim Norris, batted .415 for the Cardinals in 1969, and claimed the league MVP Award. Norris returned in 1970 to bat .333 with 19 stolen bases, but surrendered his league batting crown to teammate Mike Eden, who led all hitters with a .378 mark. Holy Cross hurler Mike Pazik tossed a no-hitter for Orleans against Harwich in 1971, allowing his only base runner via hit batsman. CCBL Hall of Fame first baseman Brad Linden led the Cards in 1971 and 1972. Linden was a league all-star in 1972, batting .372 with a league-leading 10 homers.

Orleans failed to capture a league title in the 1960s and 1970s, but reached the league championship series four times, including back to back losses in 1970 and 1971 against a powerful Falmouth team that was in the process of completing a string of four consecutive league titles. The 1974 Cardinals advanced to the title series, but were downed in the ninth inning of a decisive Game 5 by Cotuit. The 1975 and 1976 Cardinals featured Boston College baseball and hockey star Tom Songin, who went on to play for the Boston Bruins. Orleans' Chuck Dale was the league's Outstanding Pitcher in 1978.

==== The 1980s and a first modern-era championship ====
In 1980 and 1981 the Cardinals featured shortstop Wade Rowdon, the league's Outstanding Pro Prospect Award winner in 1981, he was also the MVP of the CCBL All-Star Game at Fenway Park, a game that ended in a 4–4 tie. Rowdon tied a league record with three homers in a single game against Wareham, and led the 1981 team to the playoffs where they bounced Harwich in the semi-finals, but were downed by Cotuit in the league championship series. The 1985 season was highlighted by Cardinal hurler Bob O'Brien's no-hitter against Cotuit in which he came short of a perfect game by just two walks and benefited from outfielder Glenn Fernandez's home run-robbing catch at the fence of a smash by Kettleers' slugger Greg Vaughn.

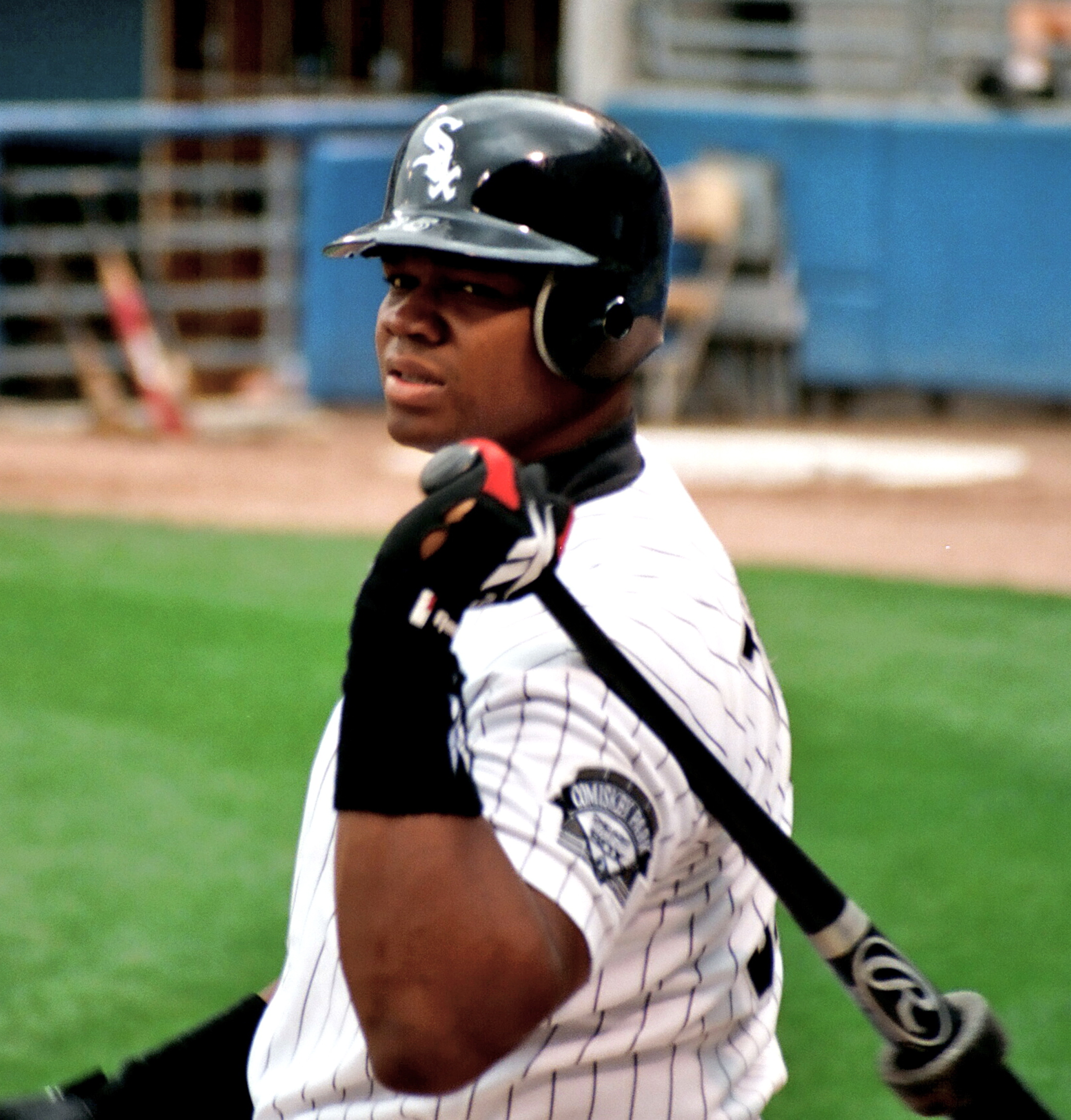
Slugger Frank Thomas (1988) was said to have hit the longest ball ever out of Eldredge Park. He made it to Cooperstown in 2014.

The Cardinals won their first league championship of the modern era in 1986. The team featured CCBL Hall of Fame slugger Gary Alexander, who hit .313 with 12 home runs, and ace hurlers and future major leaguers Jeff Conine and Mike Ignasiak. Led by manager John Castleberry, the Cards boasted the league's best record in the regular season, and met Chatham in the playoff semi-finals. In Game 1 at Eldredge Park, the Cardinals got a three-run clout from Bert Heffernan, and Ignasiak twirled a complete game to best the A's, 6–4. Game 2 at Veterans Field went to extra innings tied at 2–2. Chatham's ace, CCBL Hall of Famer Mark Petkovsek, dominated Cardinal hitters, allowing only two hits through ten frames. In the 11th, Petkovsek gave up a lead-off single to Alexander, and was left in the game to face Kevin Garner, who popped one just over the right field fence for the series-winning walk-off score.

The 1986 championship series pitted the Cardinals against two-time defending champion Cotuit. In Game 1 at home, Orleans gave starter Conine plenty to work with. The Cards exploded for four home runs, three of them by Alexander alone, and one by Garner off the bandstand in center field, in a 9–4 win. Ignasiak spun another gem in Game 2 at Lowell Park, going the distance and holding the Kettleers to just two hits and no runs. The Cards got a homer from Alexander in the first, his fourth long ball of the title series. Todd Haney added the insurance with a two-run blast in the seventh to give Orleans the 3–0 win and title series sweep, with Alexander taking home playoff MVP honors for his brilliant power display.

In 1988, Orleans reached the championship series again, powered by CCBL Hall of Fame slugger Frank Thomas, who was said to have hit the longest ball ever out of Eldredge Park, and who hit three home runs in one game at Wareham. The team lost in the finals to Wareham, but Thomas went on to a stellar career with the Chicago White Sox and was inducted into the National Baseball Hall of Fame in 2014. Eldredge Park hosted the CCBL All-Star Game in three consecutive seasons from 1988 to 1990. The 1988 event featured the league's inaugural All-Star Game Home Run Derby, won by the Cards' mighty Frank Thomas. The host team claimed the derby crown each of the three years, with Mike Thomas matching Thomas' feat in 1989, and Mike Gropusso doing the same in 1990.

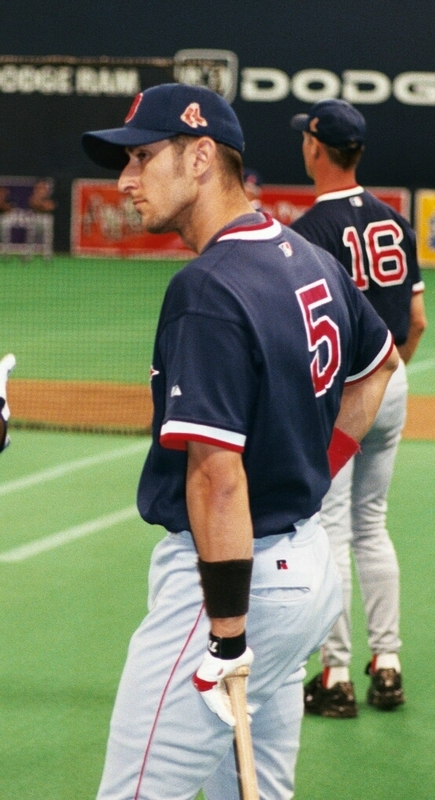
CCBL Hall of Famer Nomar Garciaparra of the 1993 champion Orleans Cardinals.

==== A second title marks the 1990s ====
Orleans won another Cape League title in 1993 with a team led by skipper Rolando Casanova and starring future Boston Red Sox all-star and Cape League Hall of Famer Nomar Garciaparra, who hit .321 with 50 hits and 17 stolen bases for the Cards. The team also included future major leaguers Aaron Boone and Jay Payton. In the playoffs, the Cardinals met Chatham in a dramatic three-game semi-final series. In Game 1 at Veterans Field, Orleans hurler Chris Ciaccio went the distance in a pitchers' duel that was knotted at 1–1 going into the ninth. Payton clubbed the game-winning homer in the final frame to give the Cards the 2–1 victory. The A's answered in Game 2, shutting out the Cards, 4–0, at Eldredge Park. Orleans got the last laugh however, dominating the Game 3 finale at Chatham, taking the decisive game by a 7–1 tally. In the championship series, the Cards faced a strong Wareham team, and took Game 1 at Clem Spillane Field by a 2–1 margin on a first-inning two-run homer by Aaron Boone. In Game 2 at Eldredge Park, Ciaccio sparkled again, allowing only four hits. Catcher Steve Fishman snuck a two-run homer down the line in the sixth, and the Cards walked away with a 5–1 win to sweep the series and claim the crown, with Ciaccio taking home playoff MVP honors.

The Cardinals' 1994 team featured league Outstanding Pro Prospect Award winner Dave Shepard, and CCBL Hall of Famer Todd Helton, who won the All-Star Game Home Run Derby at Eldredge Park and was later inducted into the National Baseball Hall of Fame in 2024.

The 1999 Orleans team featured two future CCBL Hall of Famers in pitcher Ben Sheets and league MVP Lance Niekro, as well as future major leaguer Mark Teixeira, who was named the league's Outstanding Pro Prospect. Sheets, who was an all-star the previous season with Wareham, posted a 1.10 ERA in 16.1 innings for Orleans in 1999. Niekro batted .360 and clobbered 13 home runs on the season, and also recorded a save on the mound as the Cardinals and Wareham Gatemen set the record for the longest game in modern-era CCBL history with an 18-inning, 5 hour, 14 minute affair in Wareham. Four years later, Eldredge Park saw that record broken, as the 2003 Cardinals were downed in 20 innings by Harwich after 5 hours and 52 minutes.

==== The 2000s bring a pair of championships and the advent of the Firebirds ====
The 2001 Cardinals featured second baseman Russ Adams, the league's Outstanding Pro Prospect who became a first-round pick in the following year's MLB draft. In 2002, Orleans was led by the league's Outstanding Pitcher Award winner Brian Rogers, who posted a microscopic 0.40 ERA for the season, and all-star catcher Ryan Hanigan, an Andover, Massachusetts native who was named the league's Outstanding New England Player. The team finished atop the East Division with an impressive 29–13–2 record, and prevailed over Y-D in the playoff semi-finals, but was shut down by Wareham in the title series.

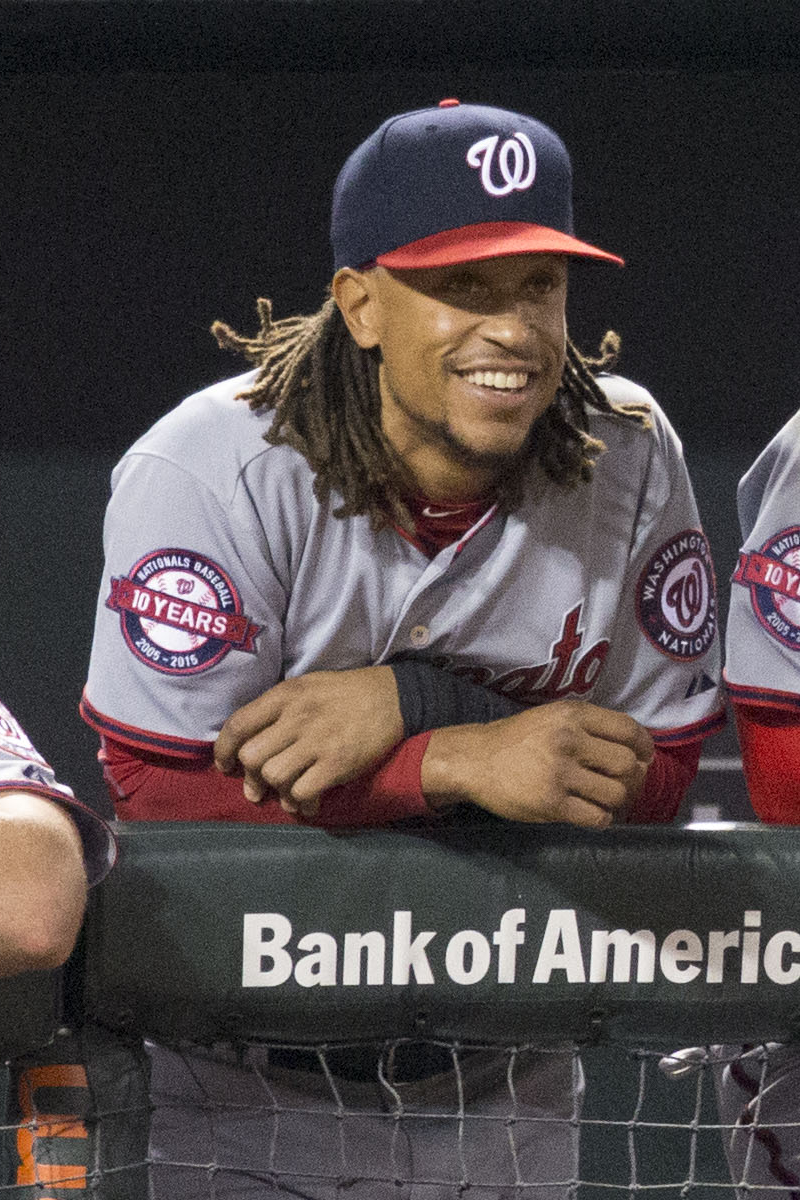
Emmanuel Burriss won playoff co-MVP for his exciting performance in Orleans' 2005 championship run.

Manager Carmen Carcone brought the Cards back to the title series for a second consecutive season in 2003, the team powered by playoff MVP and CCBL home run derby champion Cesar Nicolas. After taking the semi-final series from Brewster, the Cardinals faced Bourne in the championship series. Game 1 was a low-scoring extra-innings affair at Eldredge Park. After Bourne went ahead, 1–0, in the third, the Cards tied it in the fourth on a deep Nicolas dinger to left, his third homer of the playoffs. The teams remained even at 1–1 going into the bottom of the tenth, when the home team loaded the bases and won it on Myron Leslie's walk-off RBI single. Game 2 at Bourne was another tight one, with Game 1 winner Ryan Schroyer coming on in relief to get the final six outs, five of them by strikeout, to nail down the 5–4 Orleans victory and complete the series sweep.

Skipper Kelly Nicholson took the Cards' helm in 2005, led the team to a first-place finish in the East Division, and was honored as the league's manager of the year. Nicholson's Cardinals featured CCBL Outstanding Relief Pitcher Steven Wright, and Emmanuel Burriss, who led the league with 37 stolen bases. After taking the semi-final playoff series from Chatham by winning both ends of a day-night playoff doubleheader, Orleans once again met Bourne for the title. Game 1 at Eldredge Park was scoreless going into the bottom of the ninth when the speedy Burriss scored the game's only run in dramatic walk-off fashion by tagging up on a foul pop. The Braves proceeded to clobber the Cards in Game 2 at Bourne by a score of 10–1. Orleans answered early in Game 3, scoring nine runs in the first three innings. The Cards shut down Bourne hitters behind the stellar pitching of Brad Meyers and closer Wright, and cruised to a 13–1 title-clinching victory. Meyers shared playoff MVP honors with Burriss, who reached base five times and scored three runs in the finale.

In 2006, Nicholson's team starred future CCBL Hall of Famer and Outstanding Pro Prospect Award winner Matt Wieters. A league all-star catcher, Wieters batted .307 with eight home runs, including a colossal shot off the right-centerfield bandstand at Eldredge Park.

The 2009 season saw the team change its nickname, following an agreement between the Cape League and Major League Baseball which stated that if a CCBL team shared a nickname with an MLB team, the team would have to obtain its uniforms through a Major League Baseball Properties-licensed vendor. Wanting to maintain its independence and longstanding relationship with local vendors, the Orleans team opted to change its moniker to the Orleans Firebirds.

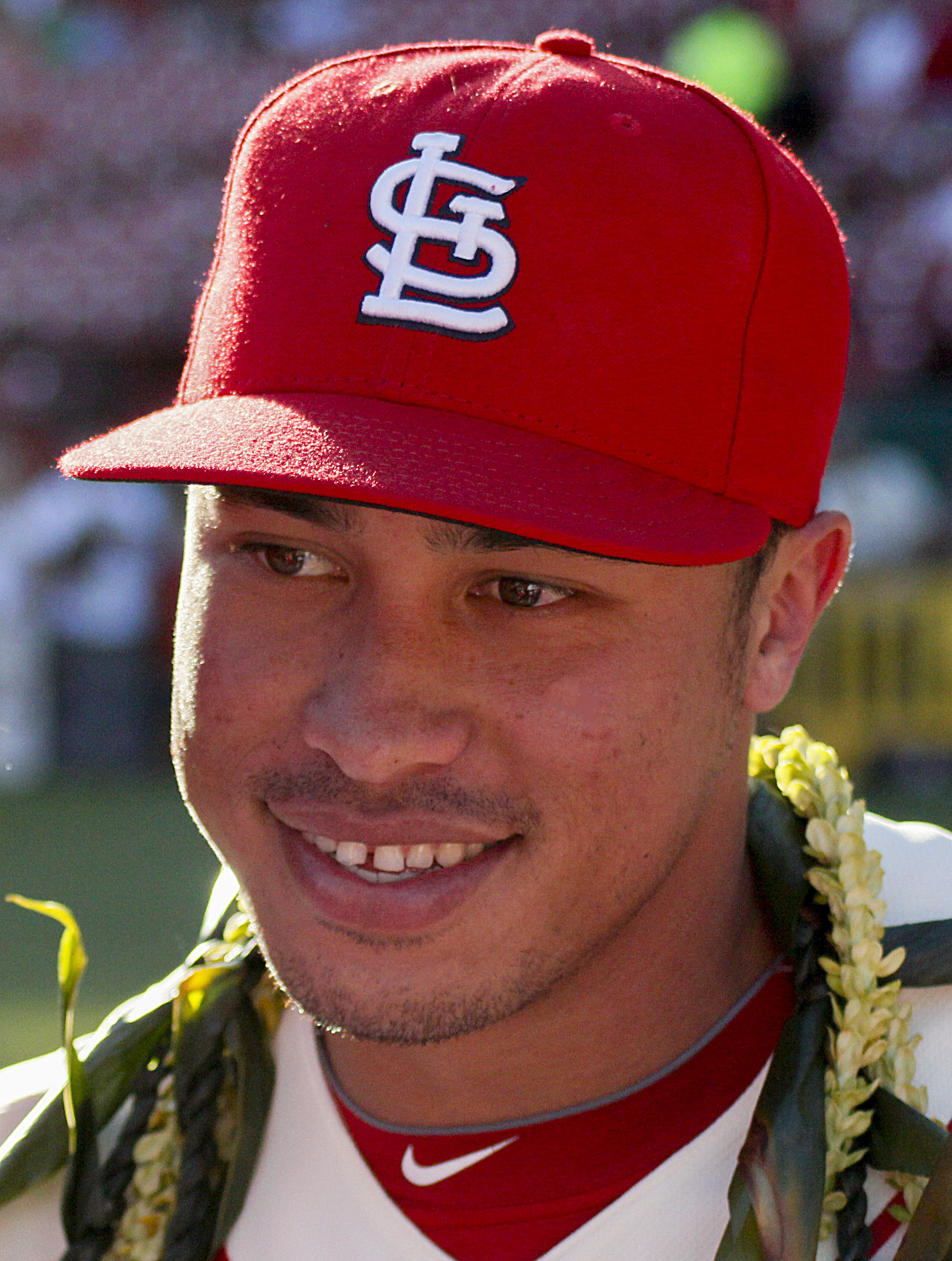
CCBL Hall of Famer Kolten Wong was league MVP for the Firebirds in 2010.

==== The 2010s ====
Throughout the 2010s, the team continued to be skippered by Kelly Nicholson, who surpassed Laurin "Pete" Peterson as the longest-tenured manager in team history. The team qualified for the playoffs in nine of ten years in the decade, winning East Division titles in 2011, 2015 and 2017, and reaching the championship series in 2013 before falling to Cotuit. Eastham, Massachusetts native Sue Horton, the team's general manager since 2000, received the league's Dick Sullivan Executive of the Year Award in 2016.

Notable players of the decade included CCBL Hall of Famer Kolten Wong, who hit .341 with 22 stolen bases to claim the league MVP Award in 2010. CCBL Hall of Famer Marcus Stroman played for the Firebirds in 2010 and 2011, allowing zero earned runs over 34 career innings pitched, and Trevor Gott was the league's Outstanding Relief Pitcher for Orleans in 2011. The Firebirds boasted the league's Outstanding Pitcher Award winners in back-to-back seasons with Kolton Mahoney in 2014, and CCBL Hall of Famer Mitchell Jordan, who tied the league's modern era single season record with a 0.21 ERA in 2015.

Firebirds Stephen Scott and Carter Aldrete won back-to-back All-Star Game Home Run Derby crowns in 2017 and 2018, and center fielder Jimmy Herron was MVP of the 2017 All-Star Game for his game-winning RBI in the East Division's 5–3 win. The 2018 Firebirds featured league Outstanding Pro Prospect J.J. Bleday, a CCBL all-star outfielder who hit .311 with five home runs, and hurlers Mitchell Senger and Aaron Ochsenbein, who tossed a combined no-hitter against Brewster. New Bedford, Massachusetts native Jared Shuster was the league's Outstanding New England Player in 2019. A league all-star, Shuster posted a 4–0 record with a 1.40 ERA in 30 innings, striking out 35 while walking only five.

==== The 2020s ====
The 2020 CCBL season was cancelled due to the coronavirus pandemic. 2021 Firebird Chase DeLauter tied for tops in the CCBL with nine home runs and claimed the league's Outstanding Pro Prospect award. In 2022, the trio of Orleans moundsmen Bryce Warrecker, Josh Allen and Chris Clark combined to no-hit Chatham, with starter Warrecker, the league's Outstanding Pitcher award winner, tossing six perfect innings. The 2023 Firebirds were led by CCBL All-Star Game MVP Jo Oyama, Outstanding Relief Award winner Sean Matson, and 10th Player recipient Derek Clark, and swept through the East Division playoffs before falling to Bourne in the league championship.

== CCBL Hall of Fame inductees ==
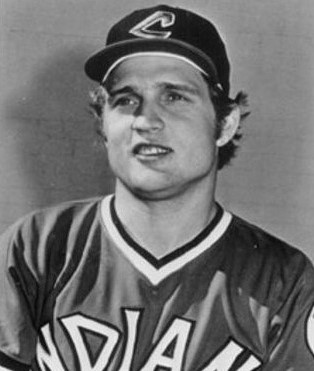
CCBL Hall of Famer Jim Norris

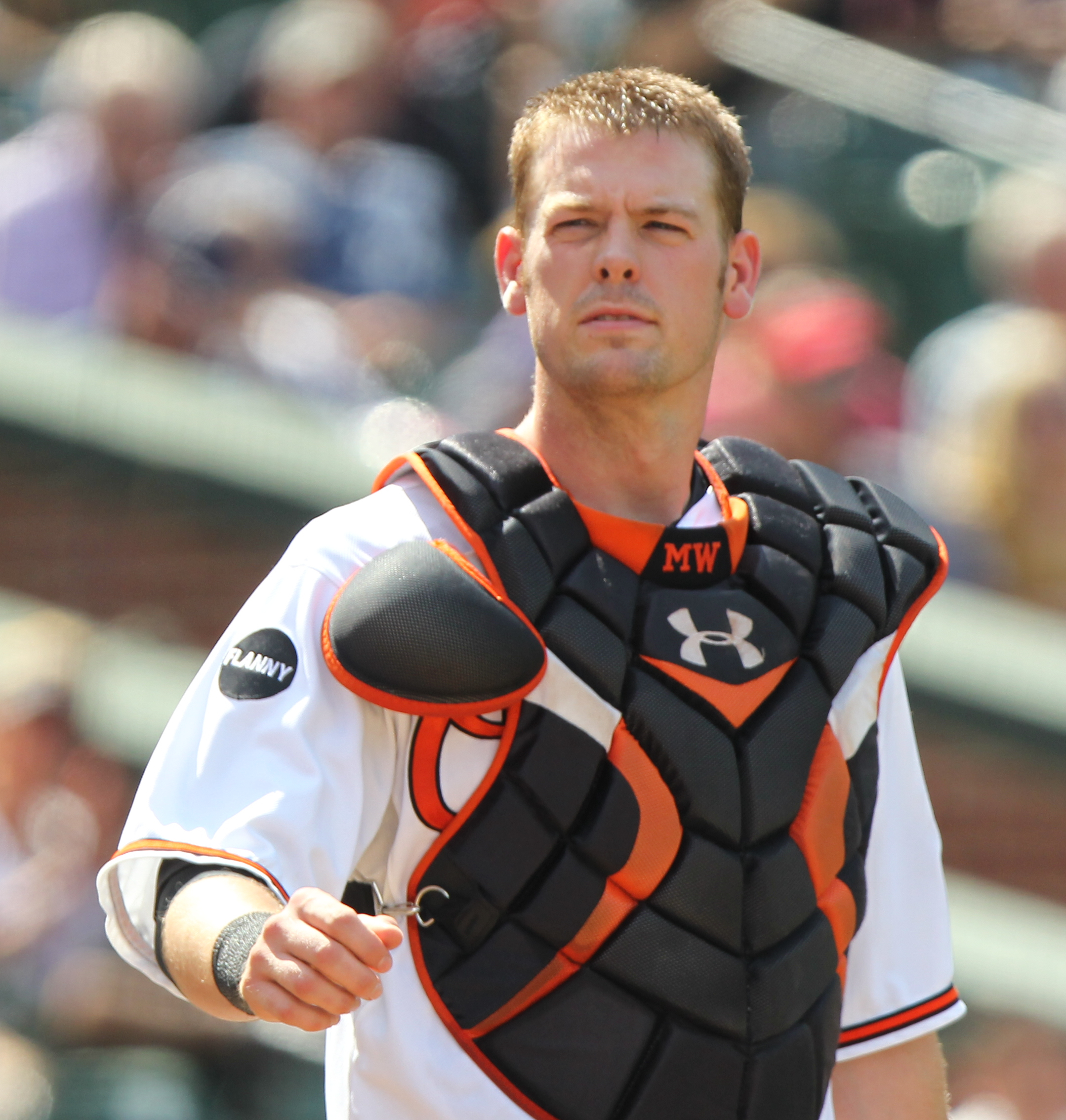
CCBL Hall of Famer Matt Wieters

The CCBL Hall of Fame and Museum is a history museum and hall of fame honoring past players, coaches, and others who have made outstanding contributions to the CCBL. Below are the inductees who spent all or part of their time in the Cape League with Orleans.

| Year Inducted | Ref. | Name | Position |
|---|---|---|---|
| 2000 | | Bill Enos | Player |
| 2000 | | Frank Thomas | Player |
| 2002 | | Russ Ford | Executive |
| 2002 | | Nomar Garciaparra | Player |
| 2004 | | Roy Bruninghaus | Player |
| 2004 | | Jim Norris | Player |
| 2006 | | Allen (Buzzy) Wilcox | Player |
| 2006 | | Lance Niekro | Player |
| 2008 | | Ben Sheets | Player |
| 2009 | | John Awdycki | Player |
| 2009 | | Lou Lamoriello | Player |
| 2009 | | Art Quirk | Player |
| 2012 | | Laurin "Pete" Peterson | Player / Manager |
| 2013 | | Matt Wieters | Player |
| 2014 | | Phil Corddry | Player |
| 2016 | | Kolten Wong | Player |
| 2017 | | Tom Yankus | Player / Manager |
| 2019 | | Brad Linden | Player |
| 2022 | | Marcus Stroman | Player |
| 2023 | | Mitchell Jordan | Player |
| 2024 | | Todd Helton | Player |
| 2025 | | Gary Alexander | Player |

== Notable alumni ==
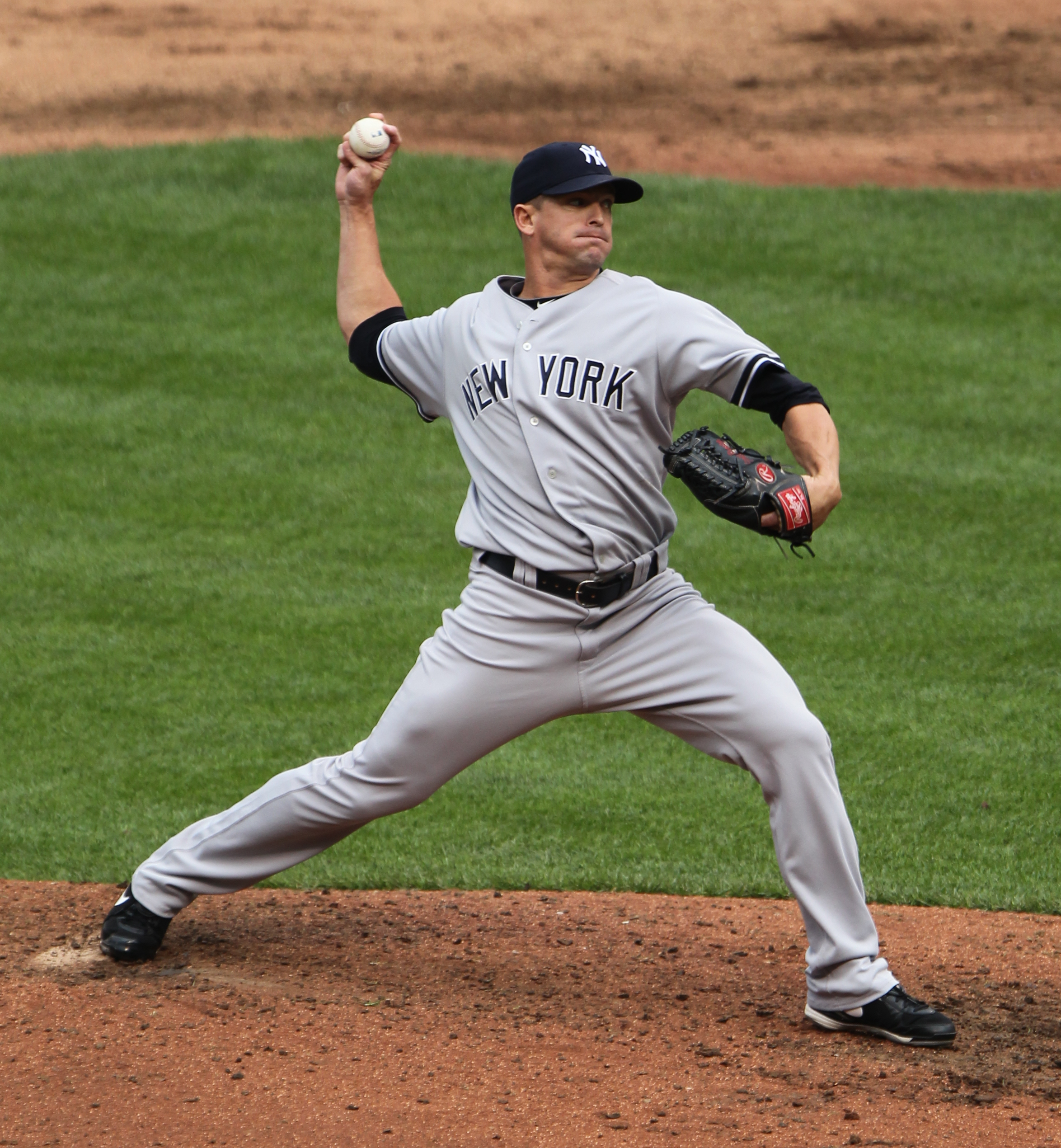
Scott Proctor

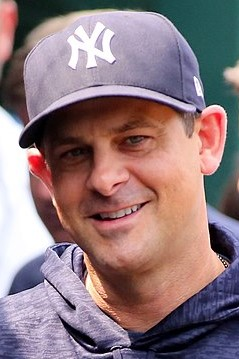
Aaron Boone

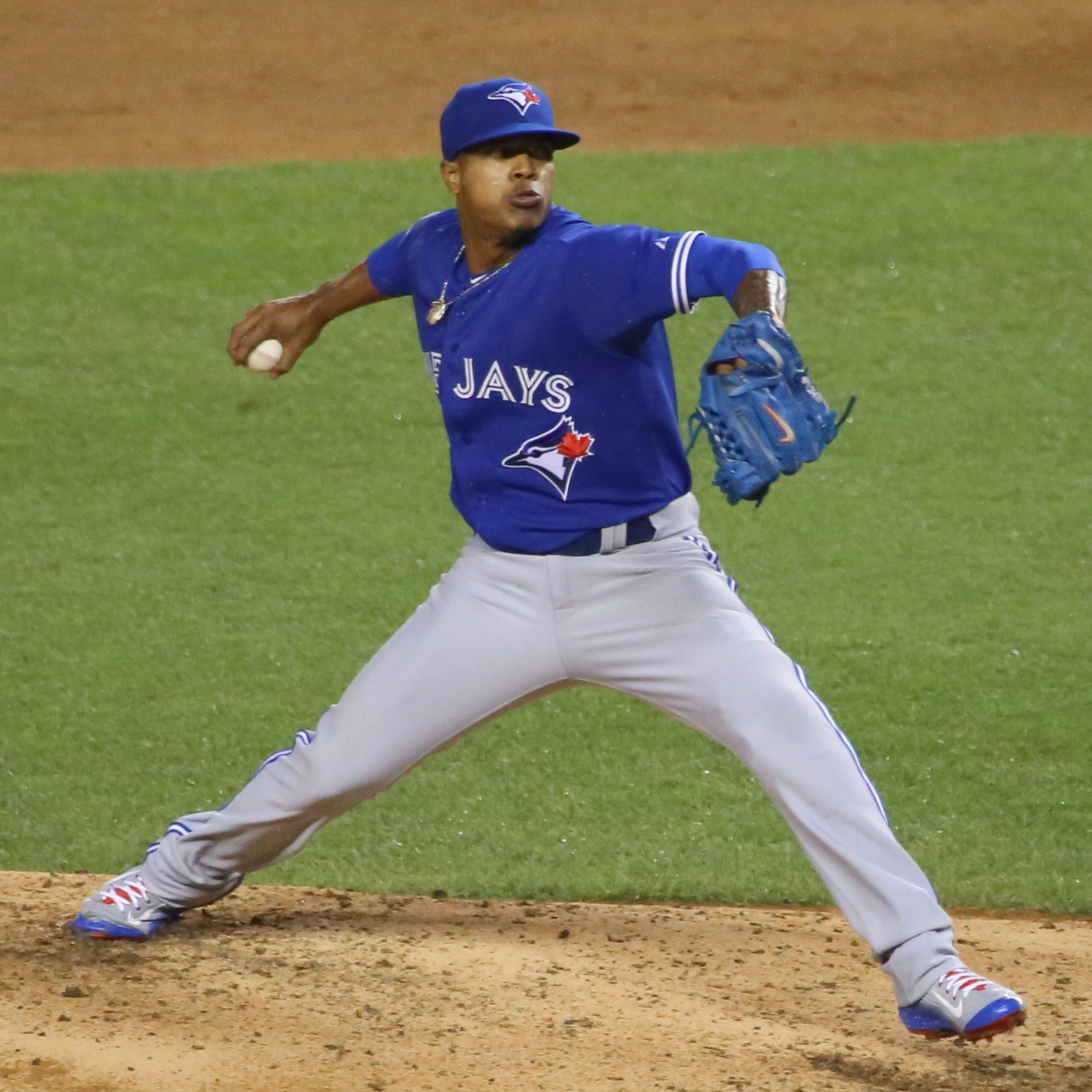
CCBL Hall of Famer Marcus Stroman

- Andrew Abbott 2018
- Cory Abbott 2016
- Riley Adams 2016
- Russ Adams 2001
- Jon Adkins 1996
- Greg Allen 2013
- Andrew Aplin 2011
- Harry Arlanson 1929–1930
- Scott Baker 2002
- Jeff Ballard 1984
- Mike Ballard 2005
- Brian Bark 1988–1989
- Brian Barnes 1988
- Tres Barrera 2015
- Brian Barton 2004
- Kevin Bearse 1984
- Brandon Bielak 2016
- Al Blanche 1938
- J. J. Bleday 2018
- Justin Blood 2000
- AJ Blubaugh 2022
- Brandon Boggs 2002–2003
- Aaron Boone 1993
- Brad Boxberger 2007
- Matthew Boyd 2011–2012
- Andrew Brackman 2006
- Bill Bray 2003
- John Brebbia 2010–2011
- Bryson Brigman 2015
- Johnny Broaca 1930–1932
- Gary Brown 2008–2009
- Jordan Brown 2004
- Ryan Budde 1999
- Corbin Burnes 2015
- Emmanuel Burriss 2005
- Drew Butera 2004
- Alex Call 2015
- Jonathan Cannon 2021
- Ryan Carpenter 2010–2011
- Brett Cecil 2006
- Andrew Chafin 2011
- Travis Chapman 1998
- Roch Cholowsky 2024
- Nick Christiani 2007
- Vince Conde 2013
- Jeff Conine 1986
- Dylan Covey 2012
- Brandon Crawford 2007
- Connie Creeden 1938
- Kyle Crockett 2012
- Jake Cronenworth 2014
- Colin Curtis 2004–2005
- Chase d'Arnaud 2007
- Bobby Dalbec 2014–2015
- Ronnie Dawson 2015
- Niko Decolati 2017
- Chase DeLauter 2021
- Jason Dellaero 1996
- Lance Dickson 1989
- Brian Dorsett 1981
- Tommy Doyle 2015
- Matt Duffy 2011
- Angel Echevarria 1991
- Mike Eden 1970–1971
- Jake Eder 2019
- Brian Edgerly 1964
- Frederick M. Ellis 1928–1929
- Brian Esposito 1999
- James Farris 2012
- Cole Figueroa 2008
- Carlton Fisk 1966
- David Fletcher 2014
- Nick Frasso 2019
- Nate Freiman 2007–2008
- Nate Furman 2022
- John Gall 1997
- Mike Gambino 1998
- Nomar Garciaparra 1993
- Dave Gavitt 1958
- Logan Gilbert 2017
- Wayne Gomes 1992
- Romy González 2017
- Mike Gosling 1999
- Trevor Gott 2011
- Tyler Greene 2004
- Tommy Gregg 1983
- Sean Guenther 2016
- Glenn Gulliver 1975
- Chip Hale 1984–85
- Todd Haney 1986
- Eric Hanhold 2014
- Ryan Hanigan 2002
- Bob Hansen 1969
- Erik Hanson 1984
- Jeff Hartsock 1987
- Adam Haseley 2016
- Alex Hassan 2008–2009
- Mike Hauschild 2011
- Bert Heffernan 1986
- Todd Helton 1994
- Josh Hendrickson 2018
- Xavier Hernandez 1985
- Jimmy Herron 2017
- Josh Holliday 1996
- Matt Howard 1988
- Tim Hummel 1999
- Mike Humphreys 1987
- Scott Hurst 2016
- Jacob Hurtubise 2019
- Mike Ignasiak 1986–1987
- Jason Jaramillo 2003
- Jonathan Johnson 1995
- Hunter Jones 2005
- Jace Jung 2021
- Tommy Kahnle 2009
- Luke Keaschall 2021–2022
- Dominic Keegan 2019
- Trevor Kelley 2013
- Kevin Kelly 2018
- Mike Kelly 1990
- Jeff Keppinger 2000–2001
- Orion Kerkering 2021
- Joe Kerrigan 1972
- Andrew Kittredge 2010
- Kevin Kramer 2013
- Zac Kristofak 2018
- Roger LaFrancois 1975–1976
- Lou Lamoriello 1963
- Greg LaRocca 1993
- Bill Laskey 1977
- Eric Lauer 2015
- Jack Leathersich 2010–2011
- Jesse Levis 1987–1988
- Kyle Lewis 2015
- Tyler Locklear 2021
- Zach Logue 2016
- Mickey Lopez 1994
- Rick Luecken 1982
- Jordan Luplow 2013
- Daniel Lynch 2017
- Joe Mahoney 2006
- Devin Mann 2017
- Mike Marjama 2011
- Mike Martin Jr. 1994
- Dave Maurer 1996
- Kirk McCarty 2016
- Ben McDonald 1989
- Jared McKenzie 2021
- Zach McKinstry 2016
- Trevor Megill 2014
- Jason Michaels 1996
- Mike Milchin 1987
- Brian Miller 2016
- Erik Miller 2018
- Chad Moeller 1995
- Gabe Molina 1995
- Willie Morales 1991
- Eli Morgan 2016
- Russ Morman 1982
- Danny Muno 2009
- Sean Murphy 2015
- Joey Murray 2017
- Tanner Murray 2019
- Mark Newman 1969
- Lance Niekro 1999–2000
- Stephen Nogosek 2015
- Lars Nootbaar 2017
- Jim Norris 1969–1970
- John O'Reilly 2016
- Mike Olt 2008–2009
- Pat Osburn 1968
- Dave Otto 1983–1984
- Jay Payton 1992–1993
- Mike Pazik 1970–1971
- Dave Pember 1998
- Ryan Perry 2007
- Chris Pettit 2005
- Philip Pfeifer 2012
- Brett Pill 2005
- Daniel Pinero 2015
- Bobby Poyner 2013–2014
- Rich Poythress 2008
- Scott Proctor 1996
- David Purcey 2003
- Pat Putnam 1973
- Art Quirk 1958
- Dan Radison 1971
- Max Rajcic 2021
- Rob Rasmussen 2008–2009
- Logan Reddemann 2025
- Jorge Reyes 2009
- Bryan Reynolds 2015
- Antoan Richardson 2004
- J. T. Riddle 2012
- Brad Rigby 1992
- Edwin Ríos 2014
- Brock Rodden 2022
- Brian Rogers 2002
- Mike Rogodzinski 1969
- Red Rolfe 1930
- Ryan Rolison 2017
- Wade Rowdon 1980–1981
- Blondy Ryan 1928
- Joe Ryan 2015–2016
- Chris Sabo 1982
- César Salazar 2017
- Nelson Santovenia 1980
- Josh Satin 2006
- Josh Sborz 2013–2014
- Michael Schwimer 2007
- Chuck Seelbach 1967
- Steve Selsky 2009–2011
- Adam Seminaris 2019
- Scott Servais 1986
- Ben Sheets 1999
- Jared Shuster 2019
- Noah Skirrow 2019
- Jeff Smith 1993–1995
- Kevin Smith 2016–2017
- Mike Smithson 1975
- J.T. Snow 1988
- Noah Song 2018
- Tom Songin 1975–1976
- Bennett Sousa 2015
- Pete Stanicek 1984
- Rob Stanifer 1993
- Brock Stassi 2009
- Spencer Steer 2018
- Christin Stewart 2014
- Graeme Stinson 2017–2018
- Levi Stoudt 2018
- Marcus Stroman 2010–2011
- Marc Sullivan 1977
- Eric Surkamp 2006–2007
- Travis Tartamella 2007–2008
- Everett Teaford 2005
- Mark Teixeira 1999
- Charles Thomas 1999
- Frank Thomas 1988
- Rhylan Thomas 2021
- David Thompson 2014
- Riley Thompson 2017
- Trent Thornton 2014
- Matt Torra 2004
- Andy Tracy 1994
- Chad Tracy 2000
- Mike Trujillo 1981
- Preston Tucker 2010
- Tanner Tully 2015
- Brock Ungricht 2005
- Danny Valencia 2006
- Mike Vasil 2019
- Elih Villanueva 2006
- Taylor Ward 2014
- Mike Welch 1993
- Al Weston 1931
- Jason Wheeler 2011
- Tim Wheeler 2008
- Shay Whitcomb 2019
- Sean White 2001
- Karsten Whitson 2012
- Matt Wieters 2006
- Cole Wilcox 2019
- Adam Wilk 2008
- Trevor Williams 2012
- Brooks Wilson 2016–2017
- Jacob Wilson 2022
- Ed Wineapple 1931
- Jake Wong 2017
- Kolten Wong 2010
- Steven Wright 2005
- Kelly Wunsch 1992
- Logan Wyatt 2018
- Daniel Zamora 2013

== Yearly results ==
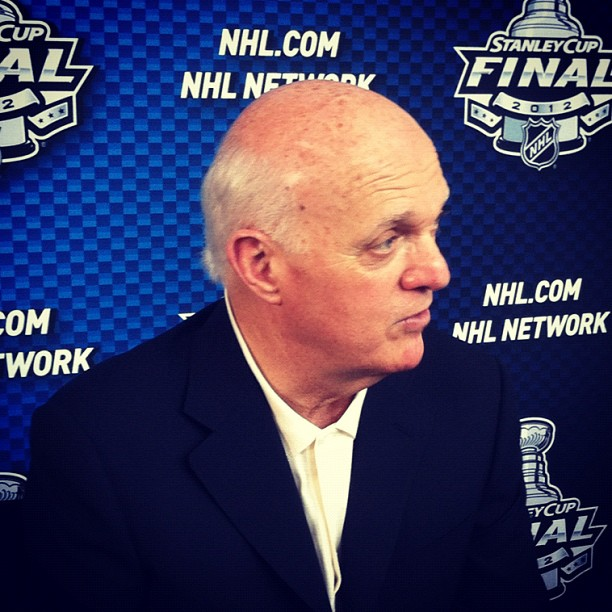
CCBL Hall of Famer Lou Lamoriello played for Orleans in 1963

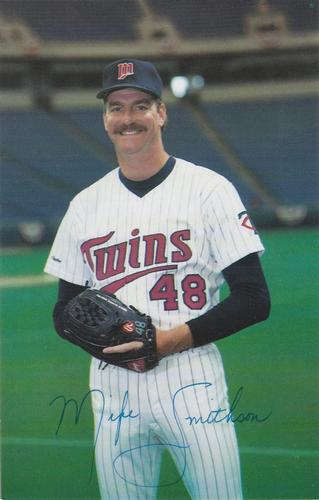
Mike Smithson pitched for the Cardinals in 1975

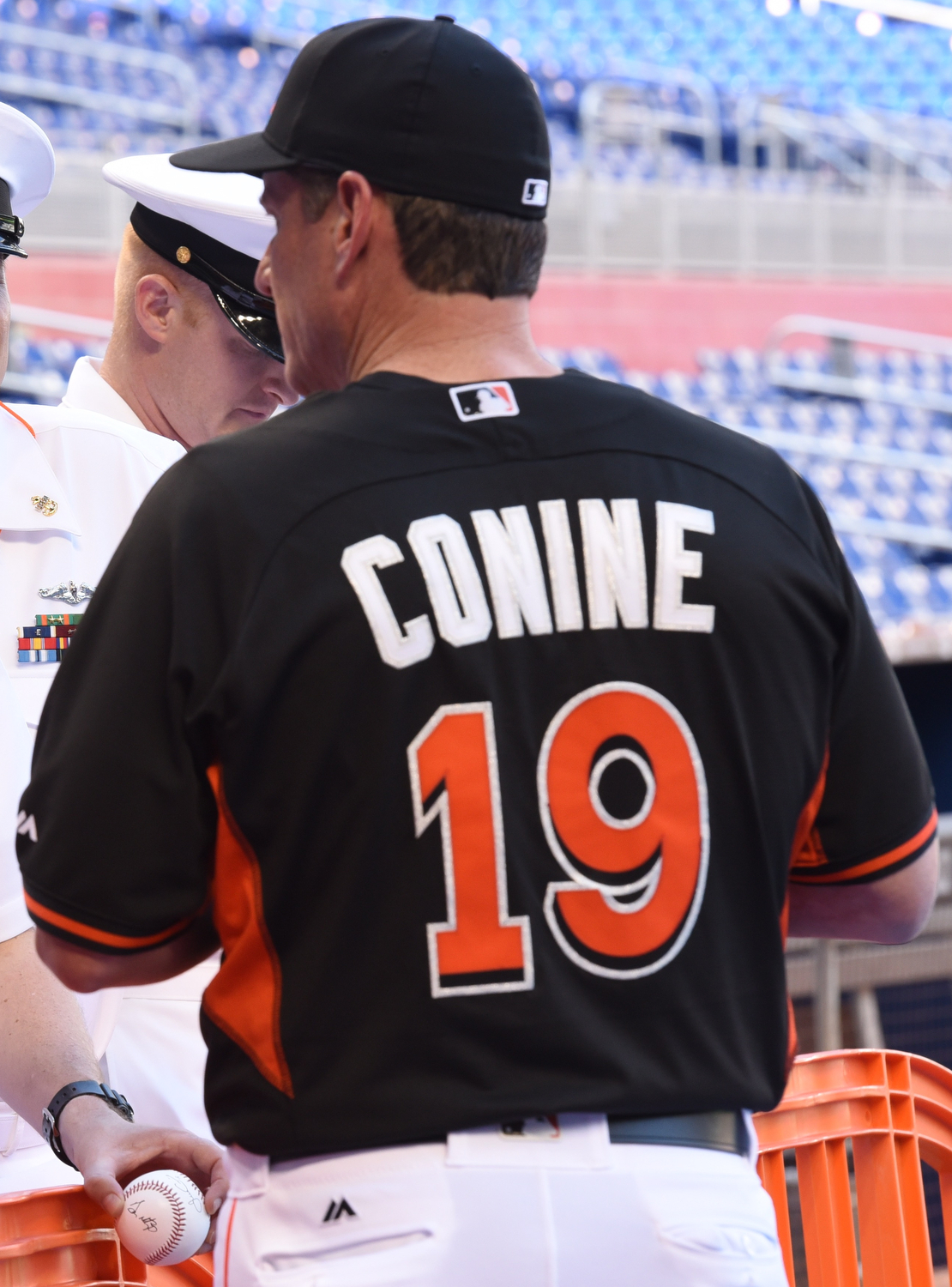
Jeff Conine of the 1986 CCBL champion Orleans Cardinals

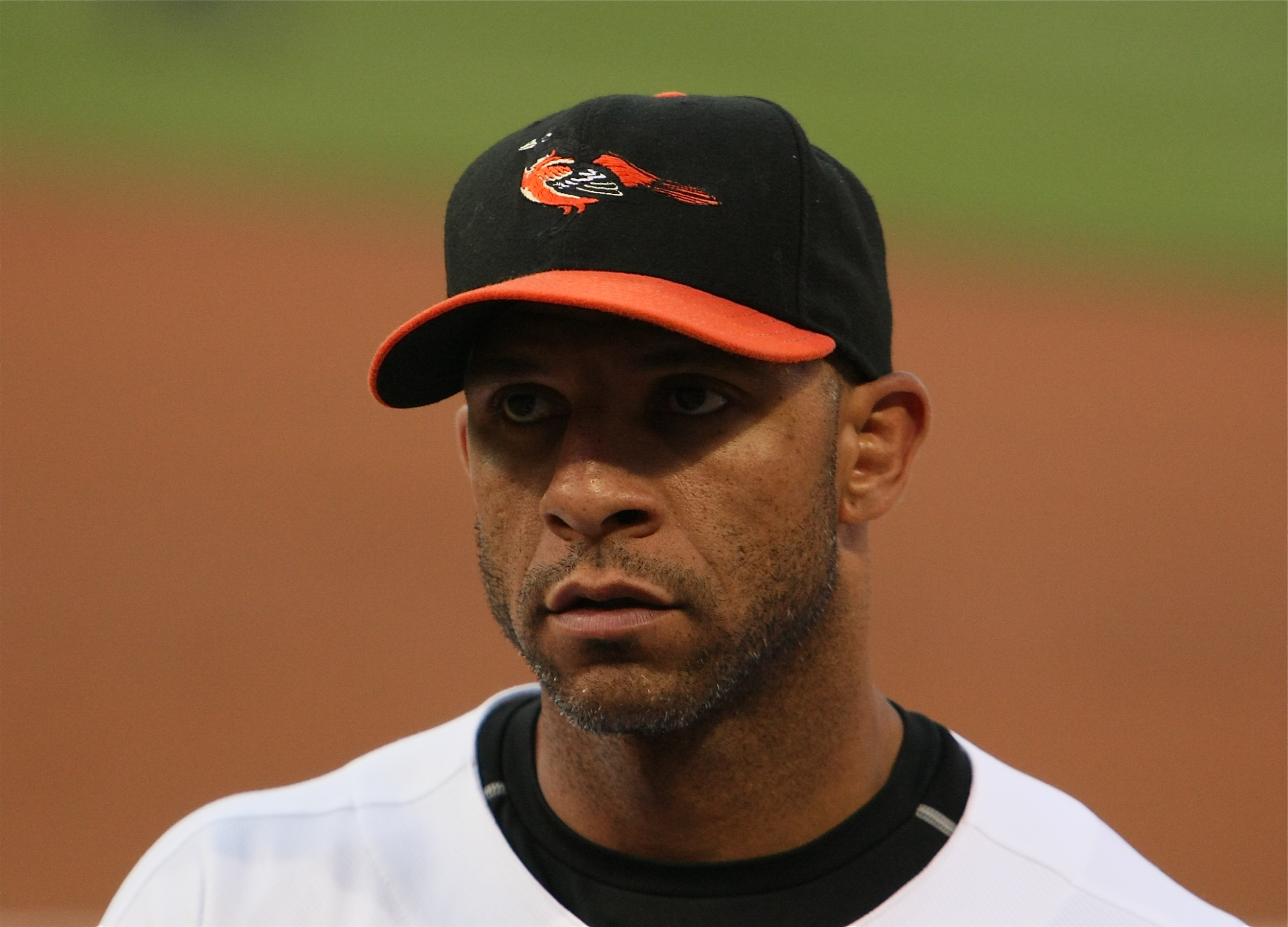
Jay Payton played for the 1993 CCBL champion Cardinals

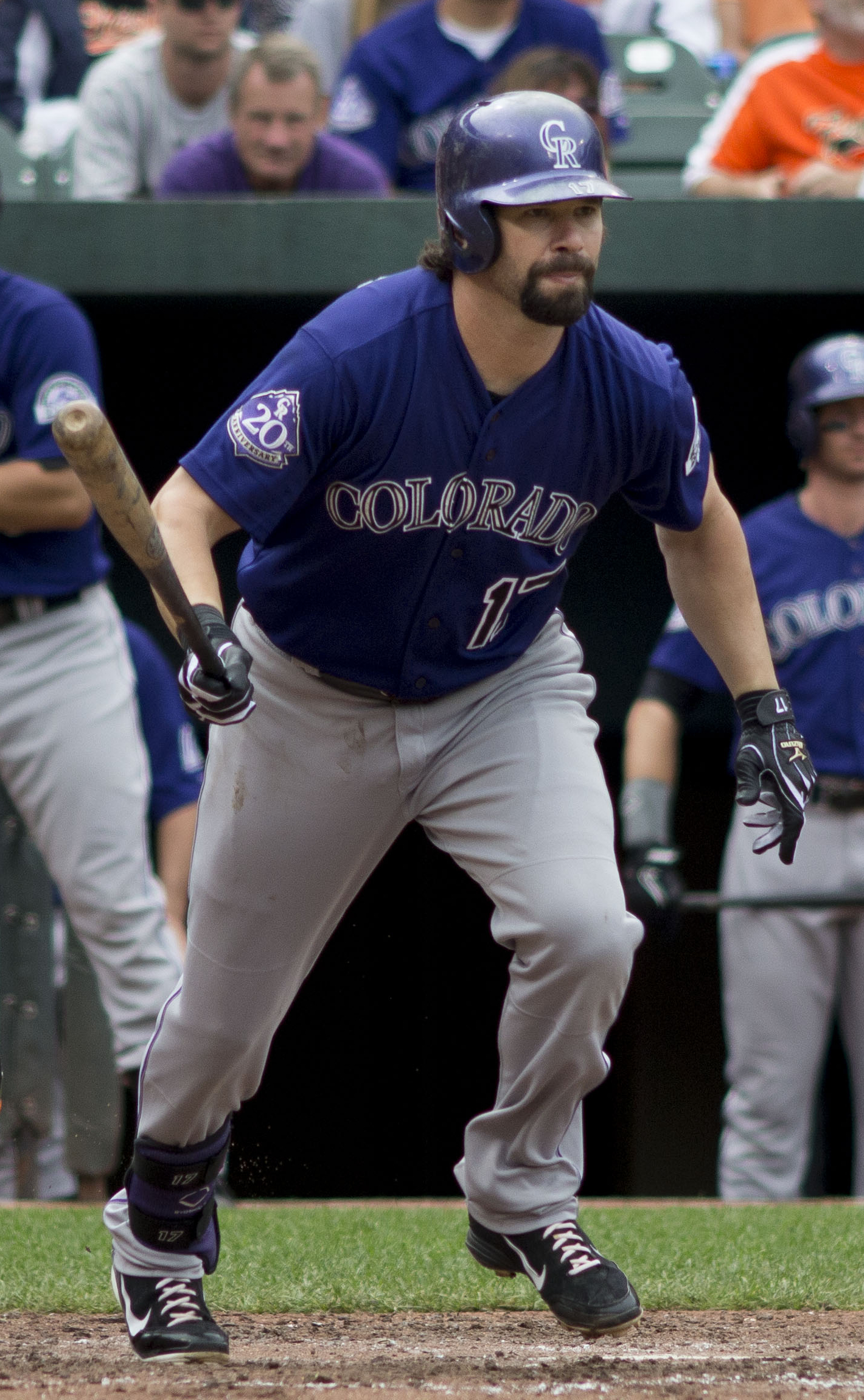
CCBL Hall of Famer Todd Helton was the 1994 home run derby champ for Orleans. He made it to Cooperstown in 2024.

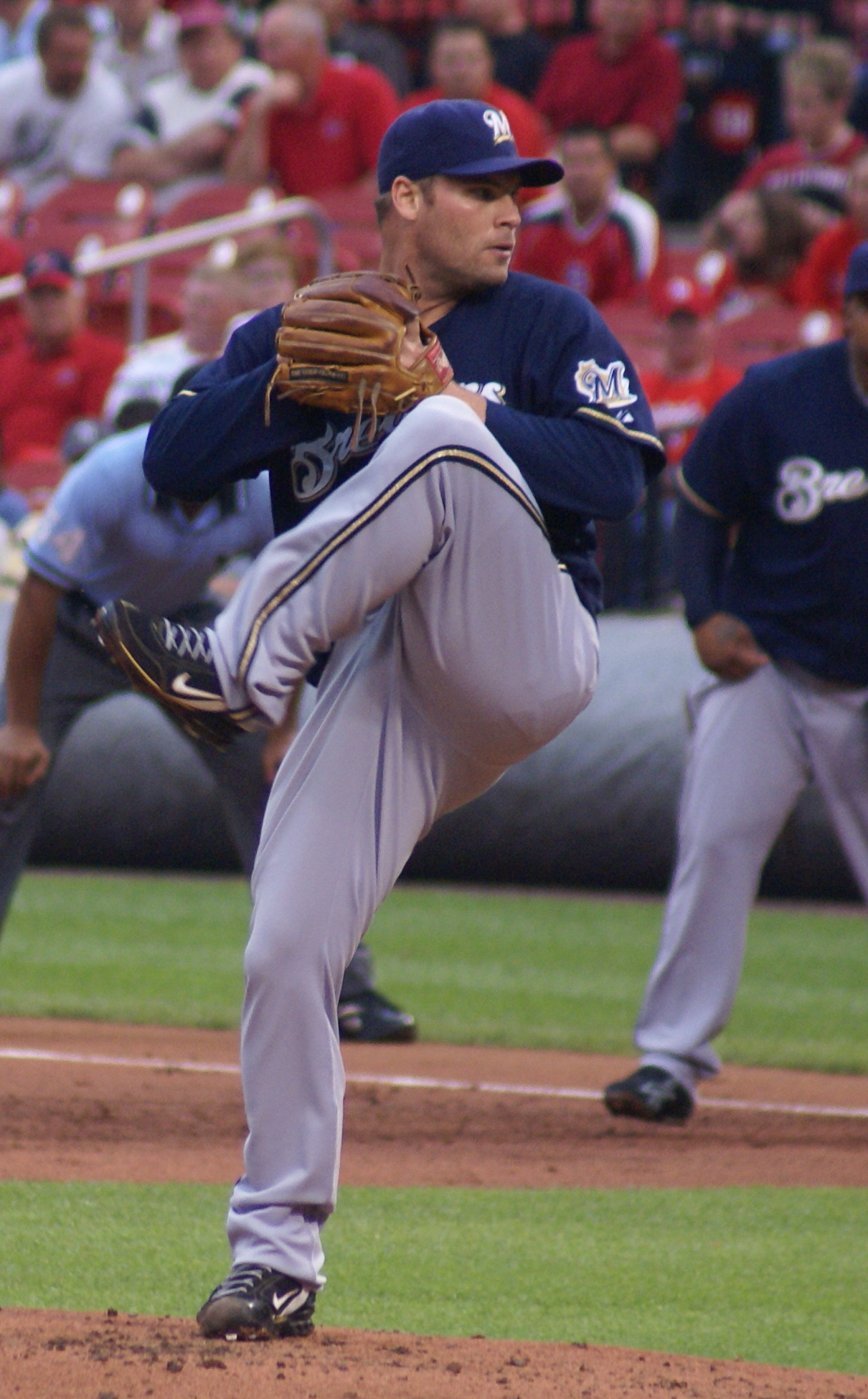
CCBL Hall of Famer Ben Sheets of the 1999 Orleans Cardinals

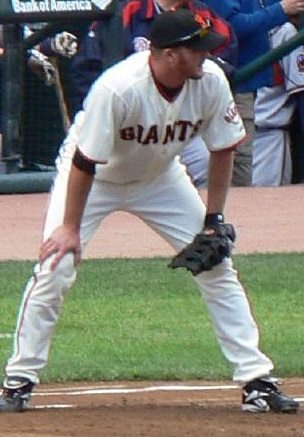
CCBL Hall of Famer Lance Niekro, 1999 league MVP

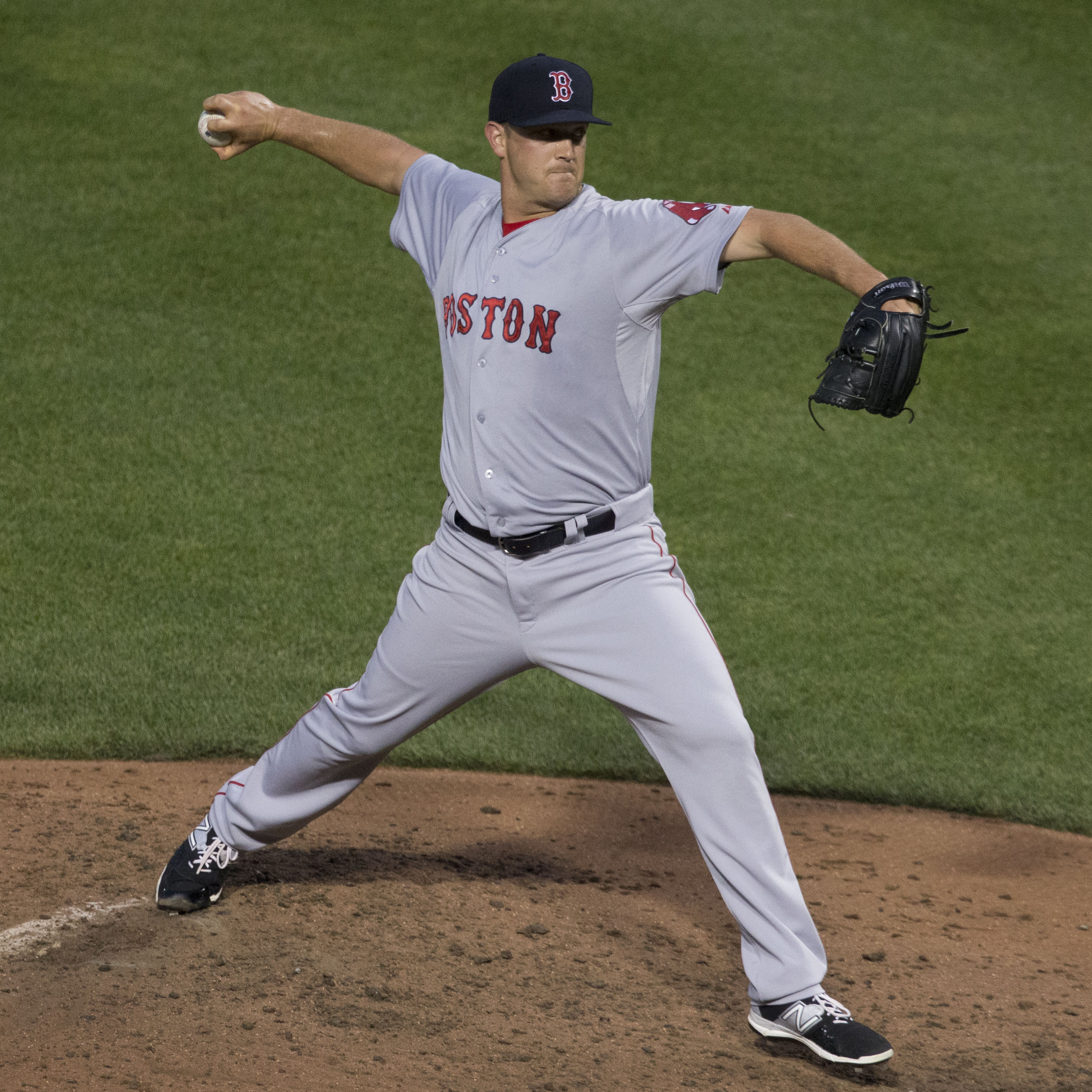
Relief ace Steven Wright of Orleans' 2005 CCBL Champs

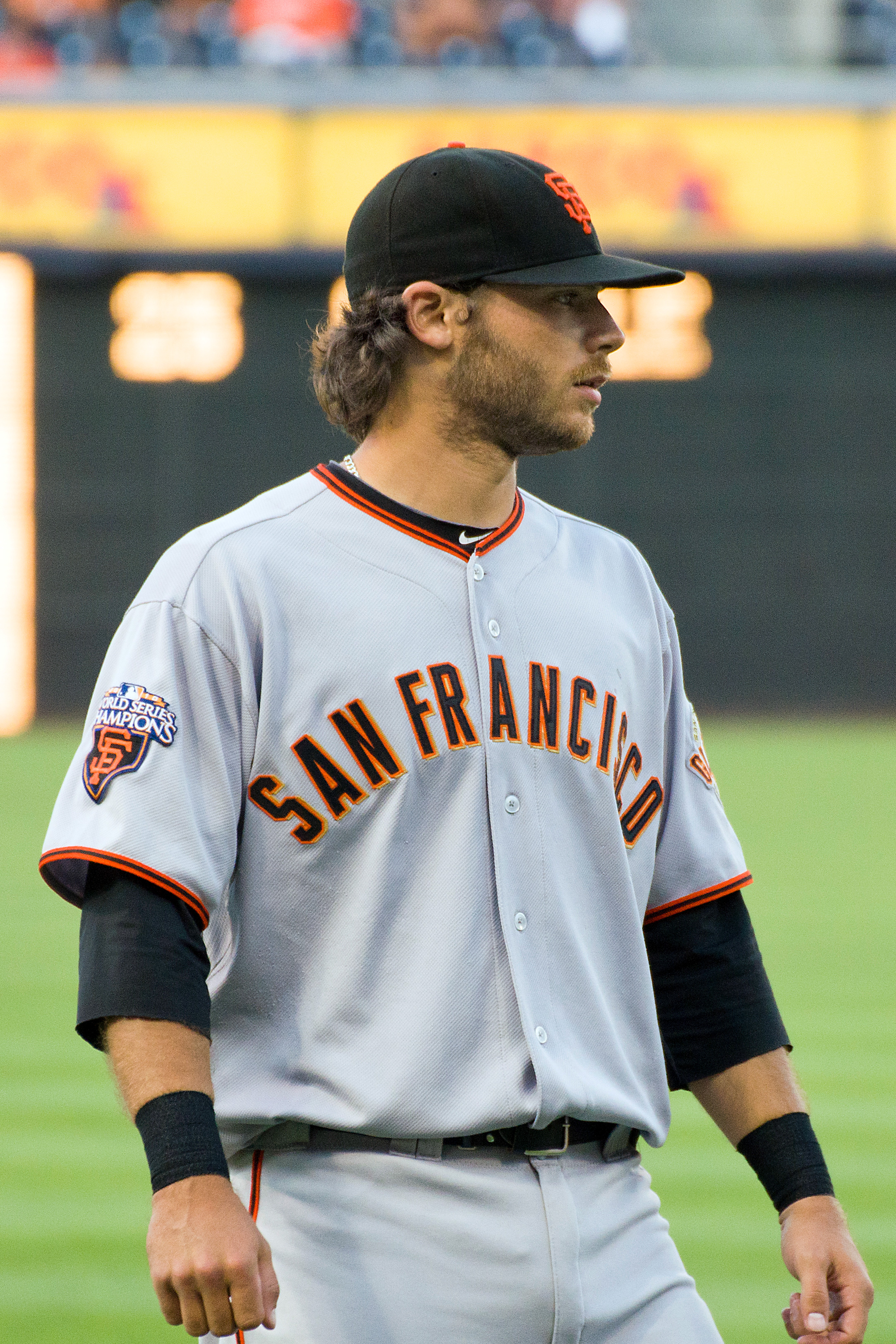
Brandon Crawford played for Orleans in 2007

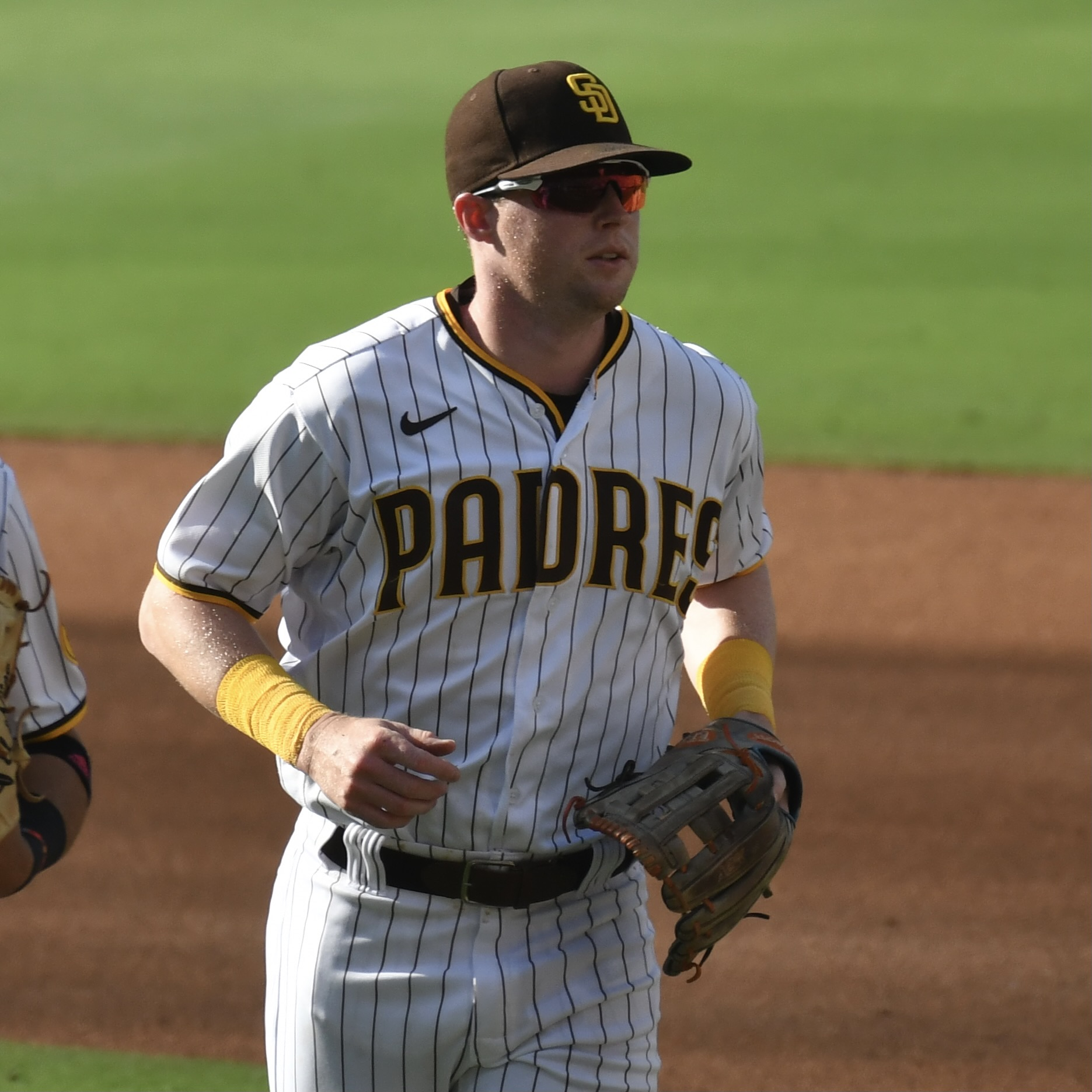
2014 Firebird Jake Cronenworth

=== Results by season, 1928–1938 ===
| Year | Won | Lost | Regular Season Finish | Postseason* | Manager | Ref. |
|---|---|---|---|---|---|---|
| 1928 | 19 | 24 | 5th League | | John "Dot" Whalen | |
| 1929 | 21 | 23 | 4th League | | Patsy Donovan | |
| 1930 | 26 | 18 | 3rd League | | Patsy Donovan | |
| 1931 | 29 | 18 | 2nd League | | Eddie McGrath | |
| 1932 | 19 | 13 | 3rd League | | Dick Phelan | |
| 1933 | 28 | 22 | 4th League (A); 2nd League (B) | | Dick Phelan | |
| 1934 | 21 | 27 | 4th League | | | |
| 1935 | Did not play | | | | | |
| 1936 | Did not play | | | | | |
| 1937 | 10 | 37 | 5th League | | Rusty Yarnell; Jim Dudley | |
| 1938 | 24 | 30 | 3rd League | | Buzz Harvey | |

* During the CCBL's 1923–1939 era, postseason playoffs were a rarity. In most years, the regular season pennant winner was simply crowned as the league champion.
However, there were four years in which the league split its regular season and crowned separate champions for the first (A) and second (B) halves. In two of those
seasons (1936 and 1939), a single team won both halves and was declared overall champion. In the other two split seasons (1933 and 1935), a postseason
playoff series was contested between the two half-season champions to determine the overall champion.

=== Results by season, 1947–1962 ===
| Year | Won | Lost | Regular Season Finish* | Postseason | Manager | Ref. |
|---|---|---|---|---|---|---|
| 1947 | | | | Won semi-finals (Harwich); Won championship (Mashpee) | Herb Fuller | |
| 1948 | | | | Won semi-finals (Chatham); Lost championship (Mashpee) | Herb Fuller | |
| 1949 | | | | Won championship (Falmouth) | Laurin "Pete" Peterson | |
| 1950 | 31 | 11 | 1st Lower Cape Division | Won championship (Sagamore) | Laurin "Pete" Peterson | |
| 1951 | 28 | 8 | 1st Lower Cape Division (A); T-2nd Lower Cape Division (B) | Won semi-finals (Dennis); Lost championship (Sagamore) | Laurin "Pete" Peterson | |
| 1952 | | | | Won championship (Sagamore) | Laurin "Pete" Peterson | |
| 1953 | 30 | 5 | 2nd Lower Cape Division (A); 1st Lower Cape Division (B) | Won semi-finals (Yarmouth); Won championship (Sagamore) | Laurin "Pete" Peterson | |
| 1954 | | | | Lost championship (Sagamore) | Laurin "Pete" Peterson | |
| 1955 | 24 | 6 | 1st Lower Cape Division | Won round 1 (North Truro AFS); Won semi-finals (Yarmouth); Won championship (Cotuit) | Laurin "Pete" Peterson | |
| 1956 | 30 | 4 | 1st Lower Cape Division | Won round 1 (Yarmouth); Lost semi-finals (Dennis) | Laurin "Pete" Peterson | |
| 1957 | 29 | 9 | 1st Lower Cape Division | Won round 1 (Dennis); Won semi-finals (Yarmouth); Won championship (Wareham) | Laurin "Pete" Peterson | |
| 1958 | 22 | 8 | 1st Lower Cape Division | Won round 1 (Dennis); Lost semi-finals (Yarmouth) | Laurin "Pete" Peterson | |
| 1959 | 27 | 8 | 1st Lower Cape Division | Won round 1 (Yarmouth); Won semi-finals (Dennis); Lost championship (Sagamore) | Laurin "Pete" Peterson | |
| 1960 | 17 | 15 | 2nd Lower Cape Division (T) | Lost round 1 (Harwich) | Laurin "Pete" Peterson | |
| 1961 | 16 | 16 | 2nd Lower Cape Division | Won round 1 (Dennis); Lost semi-finals (Yarmouth) | Laurin "Pete" Peterson | |
| 1962 | 13 | 17 | 2nd Lower Cape Division (T) | Lost round 1 (Harwich) | Laurin "Pete" Peterson | |

* Regular seasons split into first and second halves are designated as (A) and (B).

=== Results by season, 1963–present ===
| Year | Won | Lost | Tied | Regular Season Finish | Postseason | Manager |
|---|---|---|---|---|---|---|
| 1963 | 23 | 11 | 0 | 2nd Lower Cape Division | Won semi-finals (Chatham); Lost championship (Cotuit) | Dave Gavitt |
| 1964 | 23 | 10 | 0 | 2nd Lower Cape Division | | Dave Gavitt |
| 1965 | 20 | 14 | 0 | 2nd Lower Cape Division | | Dave Williams |
| 1966 | 19 | 15 | 0 | 2nd Lower Cape Division | | Dave Gavitt |
| 1967 | 20 | 20 | 0 | 2nd Lower Cape Division (T) | Won play-in game (Yarmouth); Lost semi-finals (Chatham) | Dave Gavitt |
| 1968 | 20 | 19 | 0 | 2nd Lower Cape Division | | Tony Williams |
| 1969 | 28 | 16 | 0 | 2nd Lower Cape Division | Lost semi-finals (Chatham) | Tony Williams |
| 1970 | 23 | 16 | 0 | 3rd League | Won semi-finals (Wareham); Lost championship (Falmouth) | Tony Williams |
| 1971 | 26 | 12 | 4 | 2nd League | Won semi-finals (Wareham); Lost championship (Falmouth) | Tony Williams |
| 1972 | 26 | 15 | 1 | 1st League (T) | Lost semi-finals (Chatham) | Tony Williams |
| 1973 | 19 | 21 | 2 | 5th League | | Tony Williams |
| 1974 | 20 | 15 | 7 | 2nd League | Won semi-finals (Harwich); Lost championship (Cotuit) | Tom Yankus |
| 1975 | 24 | 16 | 2 | 2nd League | Lost semi-finals (Cotuit) | Tom Yankus |
| 1976 | 18 | 21 | 2 | 6th League | | Tom Yankus |
| 1977 | 13 | 19 | 9 | 6th League | | Tom Yankus |
| 1978 | 20 | 21 | 1 | 4th League | Lost semi-finals (Hyannis) | Tom Yankus |
| 1979 | 16 | 23 | 3 | 6th League | | Tom Yankus |
| 1980 | 12 | 29 | 1 | 8th League | | Tom Yankus |
| 1981 | 22 | 18 | 2 | 3rd League | Won semi-finals (Harwich); Lost championship (Cotuit) | Jack Donahue |
| 1982 | 18 | 23 | 1 | 5th League (T) | | Jack Donahue |
| 1983 | 16 | 25 | 1 | 6th League | | Jack Donahue |
| 1984 | 23 | 18 | 1 | 2nd League | Lost semi-finals (Cotuit) | John Castleberry |
| 1985 | 21 | 21 | 0 | 4th League | Lost semi-finals (Chatham) | John Castleberry |
| 1986 | 25 | 15 | 2 | 1st League | Won semi-finals (Chatham); Won championship (Cotuit) | John Castleberry |
| 1987 | 21 | 19 | 0 | 5th League | | John Castleberry |
| 1988 | 22 | 20 | 0 | 2nd East Division | Won semi-finals (Y-D); Lost championship (Wareham) | John Castleberry |
| 1989 | 13 | 30 | 1 | 5th East Division | | John Castleberry |
| 1990 | 24 | 20 | 0 | 2nd East Division | Lost semi-finals (Y-D) | John Castleberry |
| 1991 | 21 | 21 | 2 | 2nd East Division | Lost semi-finals (Chatham) | John Castleberry |
| 1992 | 13 | 30 | 1 | 5th East Division | | Rolando Casanova |
| 1993 | 23 | 20 | 1 | 2nd East Division | Won semi-finals (Chatham); Won championship (Wareham) | Rolando Casanova |
| 1994 | 27 | 15 | 1 | 1st East Division | Lost semi-finals (Brewster) | Rolando Casanova |
| 1995 | 22 | 21 | 0 | 2nd East Division | Lost semi-finals (Chatham) | Rolando Casanova |
| 1996 | 20 | 22 | 1 | 4th East Division | | Rolando Casanova |
| 1997 | 15 | 29 | 0 | 5th East Division | | Don Norris |
| 1998 | 18 | 27 | 0 | 5th East Division | | Don Norris |
| 1999 | 27 | 16 | 0 | 2nd East Division | Lost semi-finals (Chatham) | Don Norris |
| 2000 | 23 | 20 | 1 | 2nd East Division (T) | Lost play-in game (Chatham) | Don Norris |
| 2001 | 20 | 24 | 0 | 3rd East Division | | Don Norris |
| 2002 | 29 | 13 | 2 | 1st East Division | Won semi-finals (Y-D); Lost championship (Wareham) | Carmen Carcone |
| 2003 | 28 | 17 | 1 | 2nd East Division | Won semi-finals (Brewster); Won championship (Bourne) | Carmen Carcone |
| 2004 | 22 | 21 | 1 | 3rd East Division | | Carmen Carcone |
| 2005 | 30 | 14 | 0 | 1st East Division | Won semi-finals (Chatham); Won championship (Bourne) | Kelly Nicholson |
| 2006 | 22 | 21 | 1 | 3rd East Division | | Kelly Nicholson |
| 2007 | 23 | 20 | 1 | 4th East Division | | Kelly Nicholson |
| 2008 | 25 | 17 | 2 | 1st East Division | Lost semi-finals (Harwich) | Kelly Nicholson |
| 2009 | 25 | 17 | 2 | 2nd East Division | Won play-in game (Chatham); Lost semi-finals (Bourne) | Kelly Nicholson |
| 2010 | 23 | 19 | 2 | 3rd East Division | Won round 1 (Brewster); Lost semi-finals (Y-D) | Kelly Nicholson |
| 2011 | 24 | 17 | 3 | 1st East Division | Lost round 1 (Y-D) | Kelly Nicholson |
| 2012 | 22 | 22 | 0 | 4th East Division | Won round 1 (Harwich); Lost semi-finals (Y-D) | Kelly Nicholson |
| 2013 | 24 | 19 | 1 | 2nd East Division | Won round 1 (Harwich); Won semi-finals (Chatham); Lost championship (Cotuit) | Kelly Nicholson |
| 2014 | 24 | 18 | 2 | 2nd East Division | Lost round 1 (Y-D) | Kelly Nicholson |
| 2015 | 31 | 12 | 1 | 1st East Division | Won round 1 (Chatham); Lost semi-finals (Y-D) | Kelly Nicholson |
| 2016 | 20 | 23 | 1 | 3rd East Division | Lost round 1 (Y-D) | Kelly Nicholson |
| 2017 | 29 | 15 | 0 | 1st East Division | Won round 1 (Chatham); Lost semi-finals (Brewster) | Kelly Nicholson |
| 2018 | 14 | 29 | 1 | 5th East Division | | Kelly Nicholson |
| 2019 | 23 | 17 | 4 | 1st East Division | Lost round 1 (Y-D) | Kelly Nicholson |
| 2020 | Season cancelled due to coronavirus pandemic | | | | | |
| 2021 | 13 | 17 | 5 | 5th East Division | | Kelly Nicholson |
| 2022 | 18 | 22 | 4 | 3rd East Division | Lost round 1 (Y-D) | Kelly Nicholson |
| 2023 | 24 | 20 | 0 | 2nd East Division | Won round 1 (Harwich); Won semi-finals (Y-D); Lost championship (Bourne) | Kelly Nicholson |
| 2024 | 15 | 25 | 0 | 4th East Division | Lost round 1 (Y-D) | Kelly Nicholson |
| 2025 | 22 | 16 | 2 | 1st East Division | Lost round 1 (Y-D) | Kelly Nicholson |
| 2026 | 16 | 24 | 0 | 5th East Division | | Kelly Nicholson |

== League award winners ==
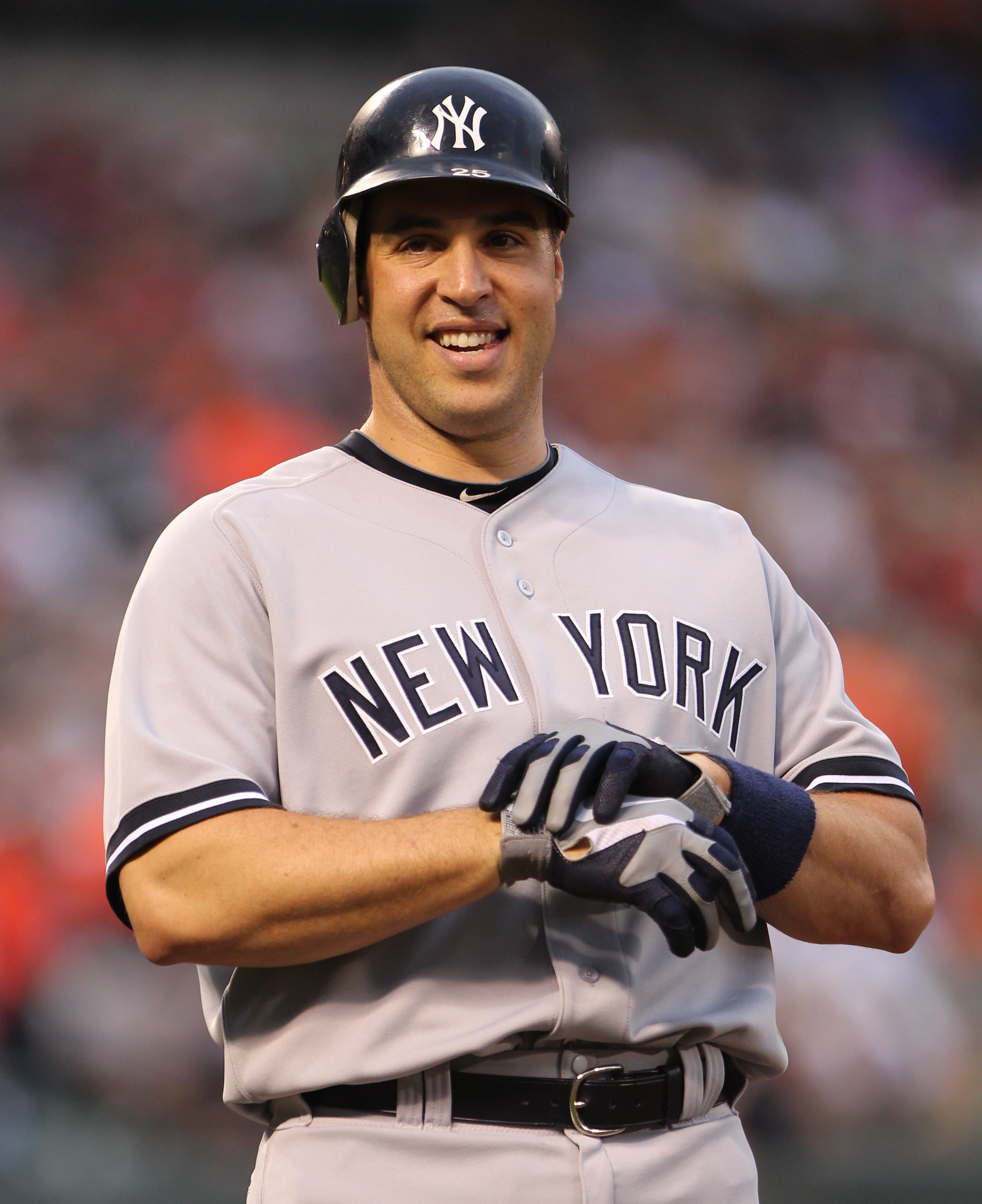
Mark Teixeira was CCBL Outstanding Pro Prospect in 1999

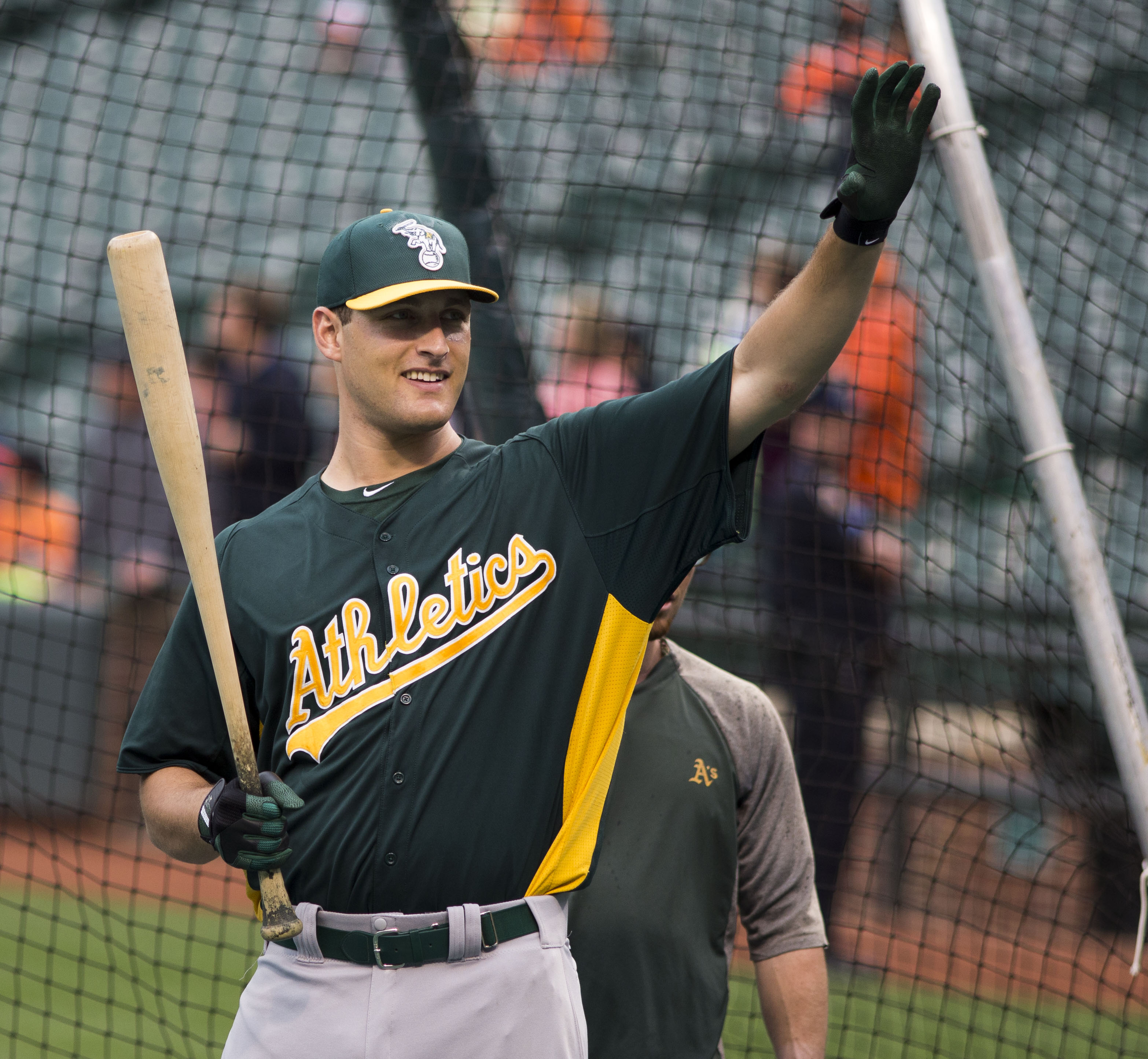
Nate Freiman won the CCBL 10th Player Award in 2007

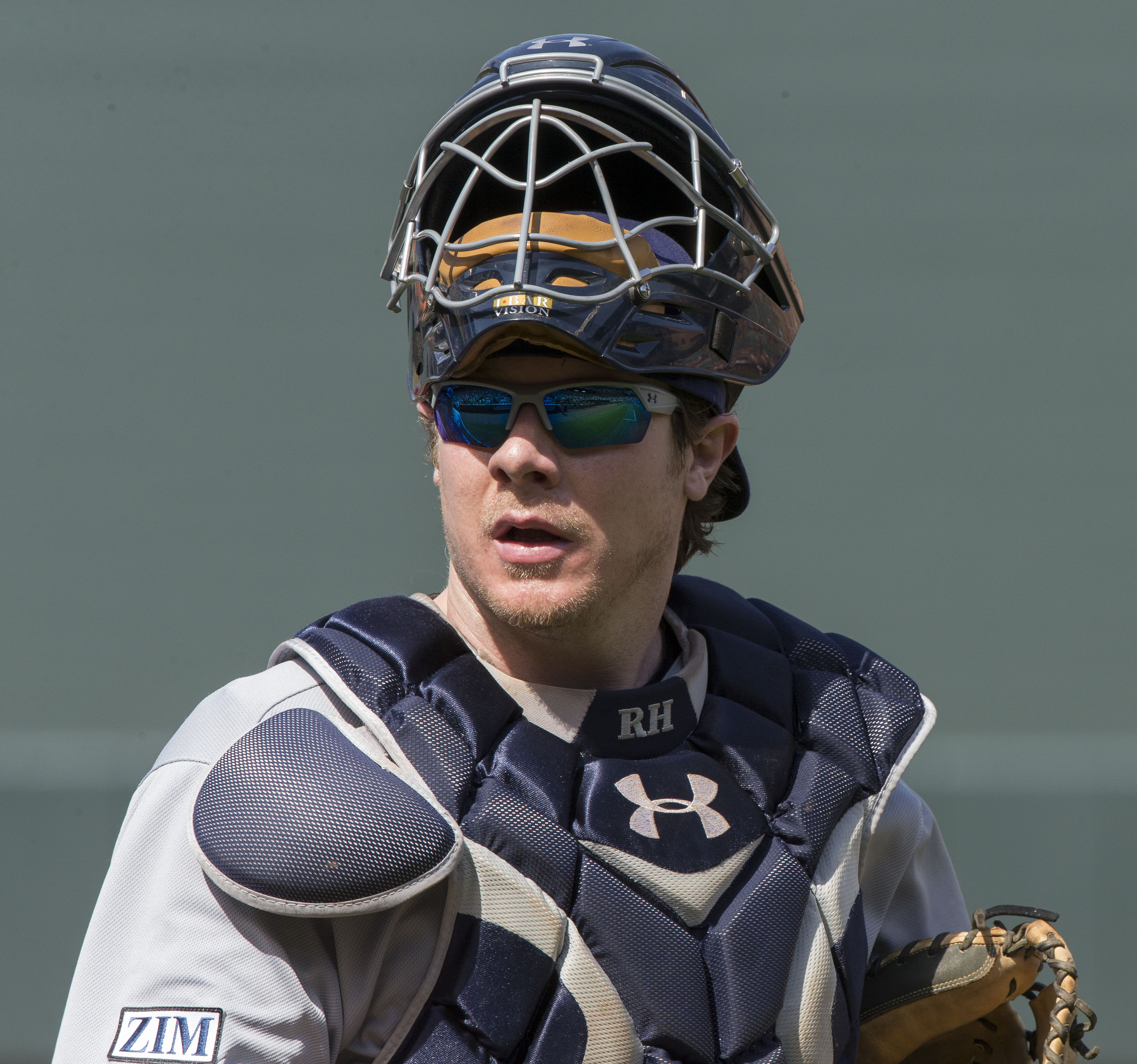
Orleans' Ryan Hanigan took home three league awards in 2002

The Pat Sorenti MVP Award
| Year | Player |
|---|---|
| 1969 | Jim Norris |
| 1972 | Brad Linden |
| 1999 | Lance Niekro |
| 2010 | Kolten Wong |

The Robert A. McNeece Outstanding Pro Prospect Award
| Year | Player |
|---|---|
| 1981 | Wade Rowdon |
| 1994 | Dave Shepard |
| 1999 | Mark Teixeira |
| 2001 | Russ Adams |
| 2004 | Tyler Greene |
| 2006 | Matt Wieters |
| 2018 | J.J. Bleday |
| 2021 | Chase DeLauter |

The BFC Whitehouse Outstanding Pitcher Award
| Year | Player |
|---|---|
| 1968 | Phil Corddry |
| 1978 | Chuck Dale |
| 1985 | John Howes |
| 2002 | Brian Rogers |
| 2014 | Kolton Mahoney |
| 2015 | Mitchell Jordan |
| 2022 | Bryce Warrecker |
| 2024 | Itsuki Takemoto |

The Russ Ford Outstanding Relief Pitcher Award
| Year | Player |
|---|---|
| 2000 | Taft Cable* |
| 2005 | Steven Wright |
| 2011 | Trevor Gott |
| 2023 | Sean Matson |
| 2025 | Steele Murdock |

The Daniel J. Silva Sportsmanship Award
| Year | Player |
|---|---|
| 1973 | Jeff Washington |
| 1975 | Ed Kuchar |
| 1989 | Brian Bark |
| 2000 | Bryan Prince |
| 2002 | Ryan Hanigan |
| 2019 | Max Troiani |
| 2022 | Garrett Guillemette |

The Manny Robello 10th Player Award
| Year | Player |
|---|---|
| 1993 | Nomar Garciaparra |
| 2002 | Ryan Hanigan |
| 2007 | Nate Freiman |
| 2011 | Ben Waldrip |
| 2012 | Jake Hernandez |
| 2013 | Matt Troupe |
| 2021 | Tyler Locklear |
| 2023 | Derek Clark |

The John J. Claffey Outstanding New England Player Award
| Year | Player |
|---|---|
| 2002 | Ryan Hanigan |
| 2019 | Jared Shuster |

The Thurman Munson Award for Batting Champion
| Year | Player |
|---|---|
| 1965 | John Awdycki (.407) |
| 1969 | Jim Norris (.415) |
| 1970 | Mike Eden (.378) |

All-Star Game MVP Award
| Year | Player |
|---|---|
| 1981 | Wade Rowdon |
| 1995 | Gary Burnham |
| 1999 | Mark Teixeira |
| 2001 | Russ Adams |
| 2005 | Colin Curtis |
| 2006 | Josh Satin |
| 2007 | Dennis Raben |
| 2017 | Jimmy Herron |
| 2023 | Jo Oyama |

All-Star Home Run Hitting Contest Champion
| Year | Player |
|---|---|
| 1988 | Frank Thomas |
| 1989 | Mike Thomas |
| 1990 | Mike Gropusso |
| 1994 | Todd Helton |
| 2003 | Cesar Nicolas |
| 2008 | Angelo Songco |
| 2017 | Stephen Scott |
| 2018 | Carter Aldrete |

The Star of Stars Playoff MVP Award
| Year | Player |
|---|---|
| 1986 | Gary Alexander |
| 1993 | Chris Ciaccio |
| 2003 | Cesar Nicolas |
| 2005 | Brad Meyers* |
| 2005 | Emmanuel Burriss* |

(*) - Indicates co-recipient

== All-Star Game selections ==
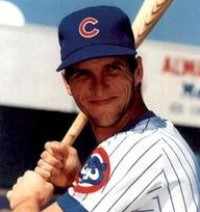
Wade Rowdon was All-Star Game MVP and CCBL Outstanding Pro Prospect for the 1981 Orleans Cardinals

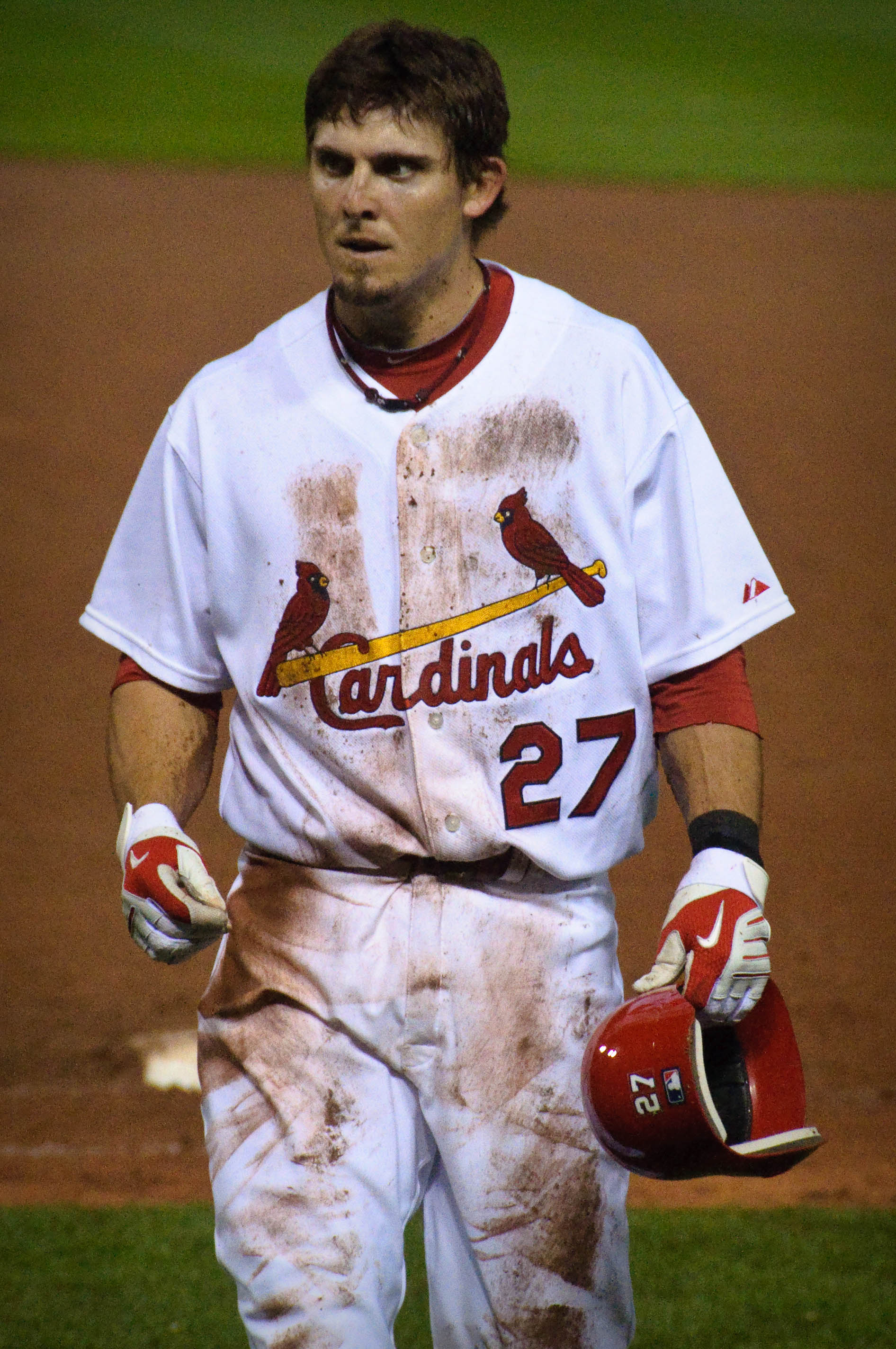
Tyler Greene, 2004 Orleans all-star and CCBL Outstanding Pro Prospect

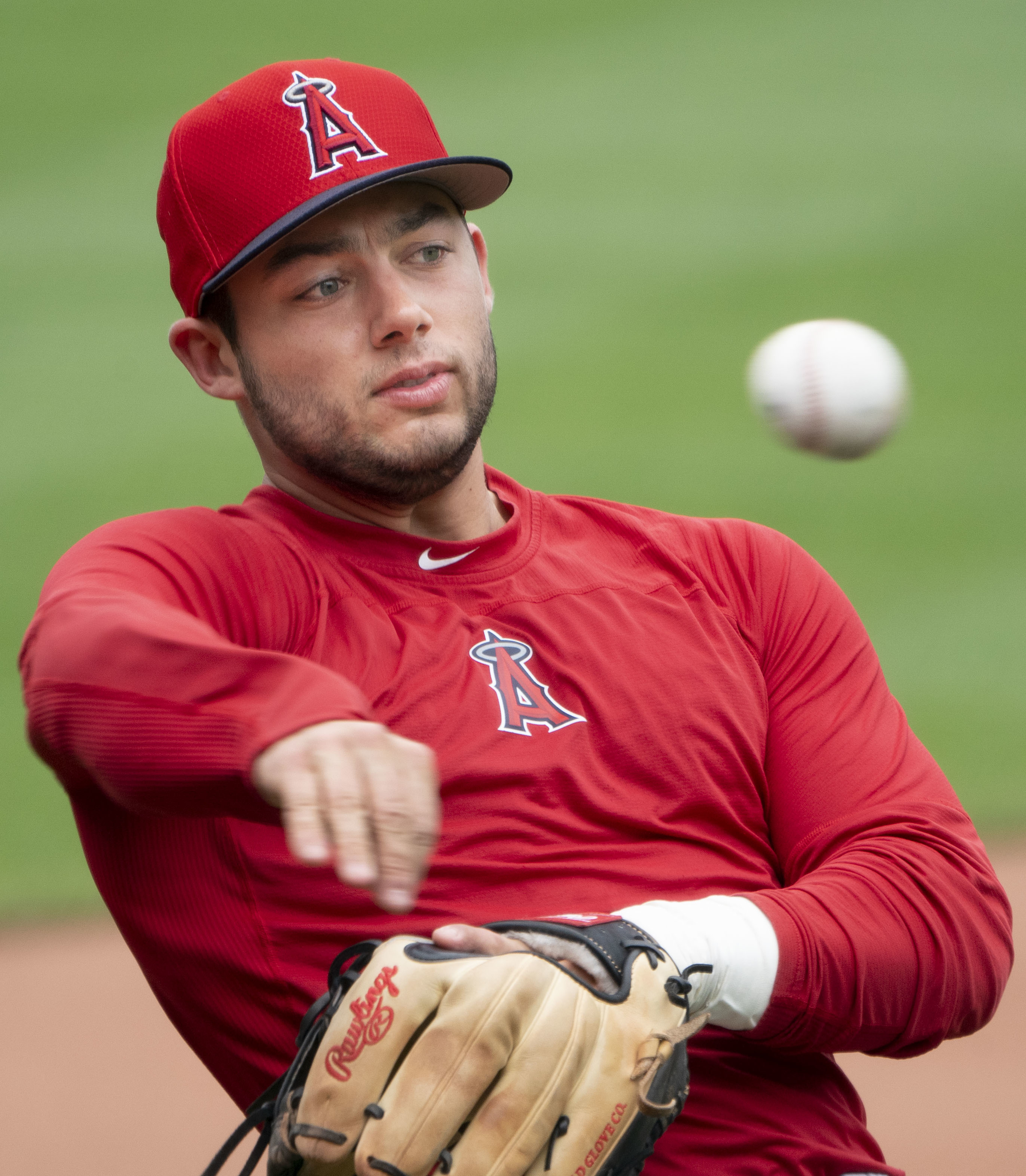
David Fletcher was an all-star for the Firebirds in 2014.

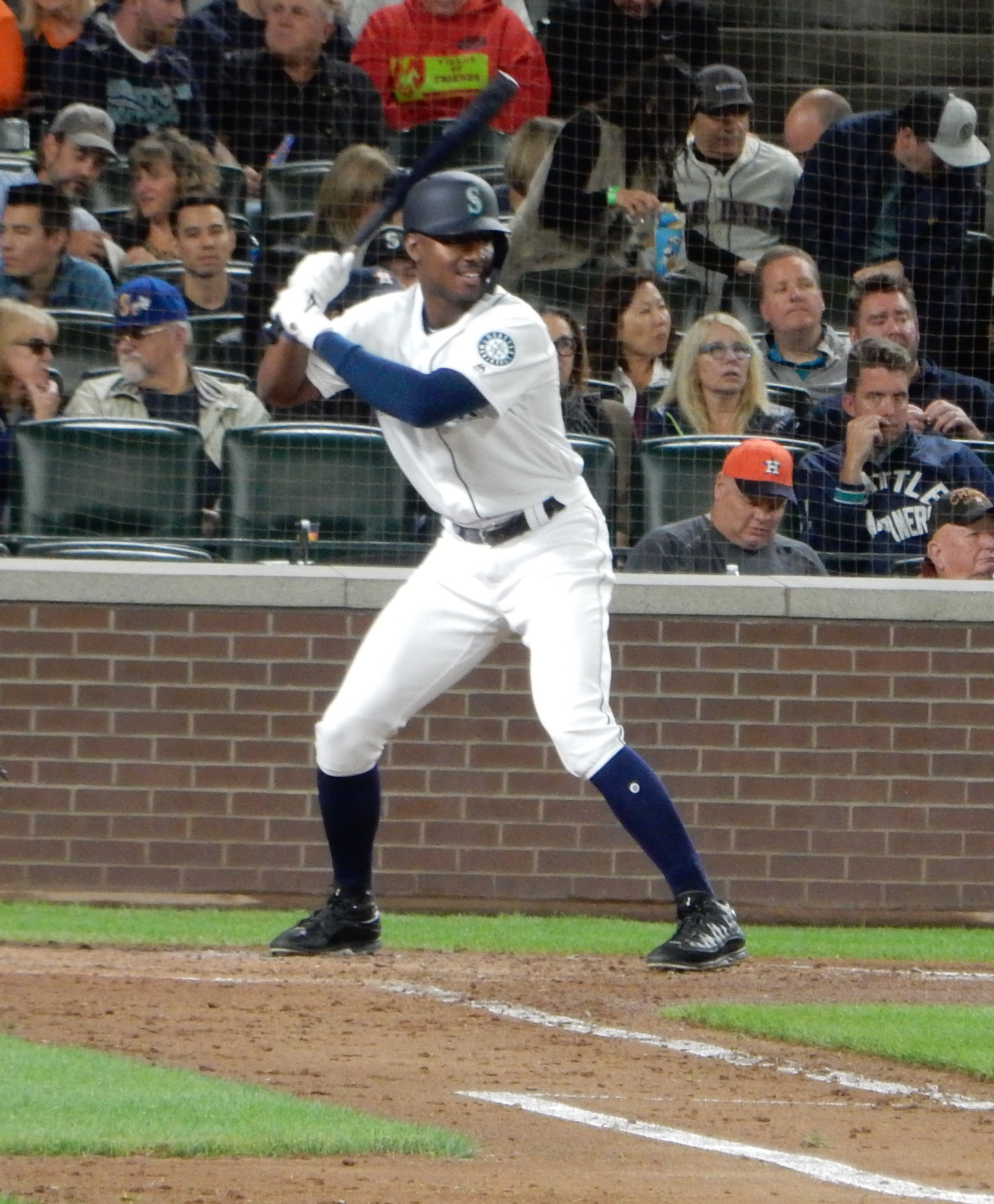
2015 Firebirds all-star Kyle Lewis

| Year | Players | Ref |
|---|---|---|
| 1963 | Tom Yankus, Chuck Richards, Lou Lamoriello, Steve Dichter, Buzzy Wilcox, Frank Canning | |
| 1964 | James Shaw, Theodore Friel, Richard Horton, Dick Hlister, Brian Edgerly, Bill Livesey | |
| 1965 | Tom Yankus, John Awdycki, Richard Drucker, Robert Zavorskas | |
| 1966 | Jim Purcell, Jim Conlon, Jack Avis, Joe Pellechi | |
| 1967 | Jim Purcell, Jim Conlon, Steve Cushmore, Chuck Seelbach, Terry DeWald, Jim Snyder | |
| 1968 | Phil Corddry, Pat Osburn, Bob Maher, Alan Bush, Rich Sturman, Steve Rogers | |
| 1969 | Jim Norris, Bob Hansen, Bud Dagirmanjian, Bruce Saylor, Joe Anarino, Tommy King | |
| 1970 | Jim Norris, Charles Janes, Scott Rahl, Mike Eden | |
| 1971 | Frank Weisse, Bob Grossman | |
| 1972 | Brad Linden, Tom White | |
| 1973 | (None) | |
| 1974 | Dave Opyd, Tim Coen, Lou Conte, Jim Doherty, Jeff Washington | |
| 1975 | Glenn Gulliver, John Siemanowski | |
| 1976 | Roger LaFrancois, John Smith, Gerry Callaghan | |
| 1977 | Bill Swiacki | |
| 1978 | Rusty Piggott | |
| 1979 | John Mortillaro, Colin McLaughlin, Rick Walter, Ed Woelbel | |
| 1980 | Ken Mulry | |
| 1981 | Wade Rowdon, Ken Lisko, Greg Schulte | |
| 1982 | Jeff Jacobson | |
| 1983 | Ken Hayward, Tommy Gregg, Bill Mendek | |
| 1984 | Ken Hayward, Dave Otto | |
| 1985 | Chip Hale, John Howes, Rusty Harris | |
| 1986 | Rusty Harris, Gary Alexander, Mike Ignasiak | |
| 1987 | Chris Lutz, Mike Ignasiak, Mike Humphreys | |
| 1988 | Jesse Levis, Matt Howard, Sam Drake, Brian Barnes, Mike Grimes, Jason Klonoski | |
| 1989 | Brian Bark, Lance Dickson, Mike Thomas | |
| 1990 | Ted Corbin, Mike Gropusso, Mike Kelly | |
| 1991 | Ted Corbin, Joe Vogelgesang, Sean Gavaghan | |
| 1992 | Lionel Hastings, Kurt Bierek, Wayne Gomes, Kelly Wunsch | |
| 1993 | Lionel Hastings, Clint Fair, Nomar Garciaparra, Aaron Boone, Ryan Frace, Bob Bigelli | |
| 1994 | Clint Fair, Jeff Smith, Will Rushing, Chris Ciaccio, Dave Shepard, Todd Helton | |
| 1995 | Chad Moeller, Tim Giles, Phil Long, Chuck Beale, Gary Burnham | |
| 1996 | Ryan Hankins, Jonathan Lyons, Rob Morrison | |
| 1997 | Ryan Hankins, Jake Webber | |
| 1998 | Vaughn Schill, Manny Crespo, Pat Collins | |
| 1999 | Tim Hummel, Peter Bauer, Shawn Weaver, Jason Arnold, Lance Niekro, Mark Teixeira | |
| 2000 | Bryan Prince, Chad Tracy, Brad Stockton, Matt Incinelli, Taft Cable | |
| 2001 | Troy Caradonna, Russ Adams, Tyler Davidson, Larry Broadway | |
| 2002 | Matt Maniscalco, Ryan Hanigan, David Coffey, Brian Rogers, Whitley Benson, Scott Baker, Mike Rapacioli | |
| 2003 | Jon Zeringue, Billy Lockin, Rhett James, David Purcey, Cesar Nicolas | |
| 2004 | Jordan Brown, Chris Nicoll, Tyler Greene | |
| 2005 | Emmanuel Burriss, Colin Curtis, Steven Wright, Brad Meyers | |
| 2006 | Matt Wieters, Josh Satin, Brett Cecil, Clayton Shunick | |
| 2007 | Brad Boxberger, Will Atwood, Ryan Perry, Dennis Raben | |
| 2008 | Rich Poythress, Tim Wheeler, Matt Thomson, Martin Viramontes, Adam Wilk, Angelo Songco | |
| 2009 | Gary Brown, Rob Rasmussen, Alex Hassan, Casey Gaynor, Elliot Glynn | |
| 2010 | Kolten Wong, Marcus Stroman, Kyle Simon | |
| 2011 | Ben Waldrip, Matt Duffy, Trevor Gott, Tyler Johnson | |
| 2012 | Jake Hernandez, Matthew Boyd, Kyle Crockett, Pat Christensen, Conrad Gregor | |
| 2013 | Ross Kivett, Jordan Luplow, Trent Szkutnik, Matt Troupe, Chris Marconcini | |
| 2014 | David Fletcher, David Thompson, Nate Bannister, Kolton Mahoney, Reilly Hovis, Bobby Dalbec | |
| 2015 | Ronnie Dawson, Kyle Lewis, Mitchell Jordan, Nick Zammarelli, Sean Murphy, Eric Lauer, Willie Abreu | |
| 2016 | Ethan Paul, Riley Adams, Riley Mahan, Brian Miller, Adam Haseley, Joe Ryan, Brandon Bielak, Drew Lugbauer | |
| 2017 | Ethan Paul, Jimmy Herron, Niko Decolati, Ryan Rolison, Daniel Lynch, Logan Gilbert, Joey Murray, Stephen Scott, Romy González | |
| 2018 | JJ Bleday, Kevin Kelly, Nick Osborne | |
| 2019 | Max Troiani, Jared Shuster, Noah Skirrow | |
| 2020 | Season cancelled due to coronavirus pandemic | |
| 2021 | Chase DeLauter, Peyton Chatagnier, Hayden Thomas, Nick Wallerstedt | |
| 2022 | Nate Furman, Travis Honeyman, Luke Keaschall, Bryce Warrecker | |
| 2023 | Derek Clark, Jonathan Gonzalez, Matt Halbach, Sean Matson, Jo Oyama, Jack Penney | |
| 2024 | Cody Bowker, Callan Fang, Jack Gurevitch, Hudson Shupe, Itsuki Takemoto, Ben Zeigler-Namoa | |
| 2025 | Cashel Dugger, Ethan Foley, Elijah Ickes, Robbie Lavey, Steele Murdock, Anthony Potestio, Cole Tryba | |
| 2026 | Dominic Cadiz, Casey Euper, Tyler Myatt, Bub Terrell | |

Italics - Indicates All-Star Game Home Run Hitting Contest participant (1988 to present)

== No-hit games ==
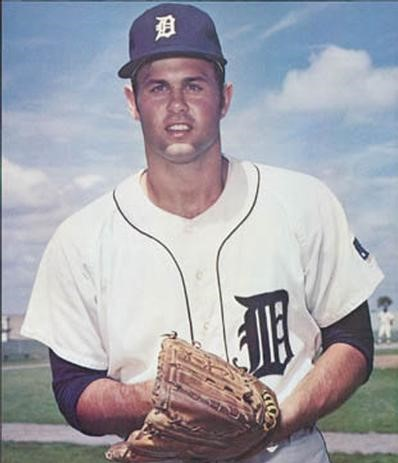
Chuck Seelbach spun a no-hitter for Orleans in 1967.

| Year | Pitcher | Opponent | Score | Location | Notes | Ref |
|---|---|---|---|---|---|---|
| 1954 | Roy Bruninghaus | Yarmouth | 4–0 | | Perfect game | |
| 1956 | John Linnell | Brewster | 8–0 | | | |
| 1962 | John Bouzan | Yarmouth | 3–0 | Eldredge Park | 7-inning game | |
| 1963 | Chuck Richards | Otis AFB | 5–1 | Otis AFB | | |
| 1964 | Ray Hartmann | Otis AFB | 17–0 | Eldredge Park | | |
| 1965 | Tom Yankus | Yarmouth | 4–0 | Eldredge Park | | |
| 1967 | Chuck Seelbach | Chatham | 1–1 | Eldredge Park | 7-inning game; Tie game | |
| 1971 | Mike Pazik | Harwich | 6–0 | Eldredge Park | | |
| 1985 | Bob O'Brien | Cotuit | 8–0 | Eldredge Park | | |
| 2000 | Jon Steitz | Bourne | 7–2 | Coady Field | 6-inning game | |
| 2018 | Mitchell Senger | Brewster | 3–2 | Stony Brook Field | Combined | |
| 2018 | Aaron Ochsenbein | Brewster | 3–2 | Stony Brook Field | Combined | |
| 2022 | Bryce Warrecker | Chatham | 4–0 | Eldredge Park | Combined | |
| 2022 | Josh Allen | Chatham | 4–0 | Eldredge Park | Combined | |
| 2022 | Chris Clark | Chatham | 4–0 | Eldredge Park | Combined | |

== Managerial history ==
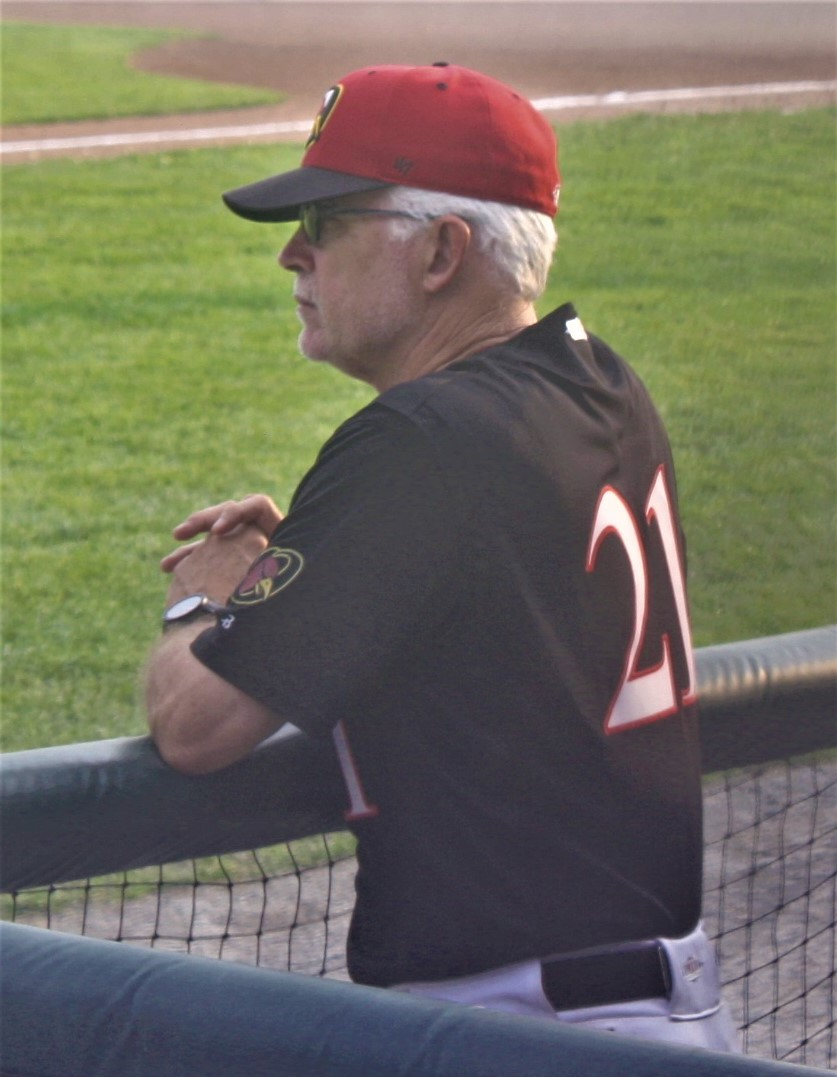
Longtime Firebirds skipper Kelly Nicholson.

| Manager | Seasons | Total Seasons | Championship Seasons |
|---|---|---|---|
| Patsy Donovan | 1929–1930 | 2 | |
| Herb Fuller | 1947–1948 | 2 | 1947 |
| Laurin "Pete" Peterson | 1949–1962 | 14 | 1949, 1950, 1952, 1953, 1955, 1957 |
| Dave Gavitt | 1963–1964; 1966–1967 | 4 | |
| Dave Williams | 1965 | 1 | |
| Tony Williams | 1968–1973 | 6 | |
| Tom Yankus | 1974–1980 | 7 | |
| Jack Donahue | 1981–1983 | 3 | |
| John Castleberry | 1984–1991 | 8 | 1986 |
| Rolando Casanova | 1992–1996 | 5 | 1993 |
| Don Norris | 1997–2001 | 5 | |
| Carmen Carcone | 2002–2004 | 3 | 2003 |
| Kelly Nicholson | 2005–2026 | 21* | 2005 |

(*) - Season count excludes 2020 CCBL season cancelled due to coronavirus pandemic.

== Broadcasters ==
The Firebirds were one of the first teams in the Cape Cod Baseball League to have student broadcast interns.

- Andrew Gothelf (Northwestern University) 2007–08
- Tristan Hobbes (Eastern Connecticut State University) 2010
- Craig Durham (University of Colorado, Boulder) 2010
- Kevin Fitzgerald (Syracuse University) 2012–13
- Sam Levitt (Northwestern University) 2012–13
- David Fine (Syracuse University) 2014
- Sean Hooley (Boston College) 2014
- Nate Gatter (University of Missouri) 2015
- Ryan Bafaloukos (Arizona State University) 2015
- Logan Ratick (Syracuse University) 2016
- Brendan King (Butler University) 2016
- Tyler Aki (Syracuse University) 2017
- Noah Johnson (University of Maryland, College Park) 2017
- Braiden Bell (Arizona State University) 2018
- Josh White (University of Miami) 2018–19
- Thomas Zinzarella (Providence College) 2019
- Jacob Kronberg (Syracuse University) 2020
- Brandon Ross (Syracuse University) 2020
- Carlo Jiménez (University of Southern California) 2021
- Gareth Kwok (Arizona State University) 2021
- Jack Johnson (Arizona State University) 2022
- Luke Moehle (University of Missouri) 2022
- Sammy Miller, sidelines (Arizona State University) 2023
- Dylan Pescatore (Arizona State University) 2023–24
- Ian Nicholas (Syracuse University) 2023–24
- Tyler Aitken, sidelines (Syracuse University) 2024
- Jish Sokolsky (Syracuse University) 2025
- Briggs Loveland (Emerson College) 2025
- Allie Campbell, sidelines (University of Tennessee) 2025

== See also ==
- Orleans Firebirds players
