= List of Cincinnati Reds first-round draft picks =

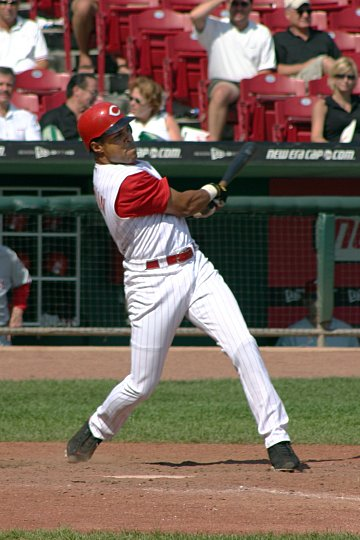
Barry Larkin, the Reds' 1985 selection and a 2012 Hall of Fame inductee, was named to 14 All-Star teams in his 19-year career.

The Cincinnati Reds are a Major League Baseball (MLB) franchise based in Cincinnati, Ohio. They play in the National League Central division. Officially known as the "First-Year Player Draft", the Rule 4 Draft is MLB's primary mechanism for assigning players from high schools, colleges, and other amateur clubs to its franchises. The draft order is determined based on the previous season's standings, with the team possessing the worst record receiving the first pick. In addition, teams which lost free agents in the previous off-season may be awarded compensatory or supplementary picks. Since the establishment of the draft in 1965, the Reds have selected 59 players in the first round.

Of those 59 players, 28 have been pitchers, the most of any position; 22 of these were right-handed, while 6 were left-handed. The Reds have also selected 13 outfielders, eight shortstops, four catchers, four third basemen and two first basemen. They have never selected a second baseman in the initial round of the draft. The franchise has drafted eleven players from colleges or high schools in California, while another eight were drafted out of Texas. The only first-round pick out of the Reds' home state of Ohio was Barry Larkin, a native of Cincinnati.

One of these picks has been elected to the Baseball Hall of Fame; Barry Larkin, drafted in 1985, was elected to the Hall in his third year of eligibility in 2012. Five of these picks have won a World Series championship with the Reds. Don Gullett & Gary Nolan won two consecutive Series with the Reds, 1975 and 1976, and Gullett won again in 1977 as a member of the New York Yankees. Three of the Reds first-round picks participated in the team's 1990 championship: Larkin, Scott Scudder, and Jack Armstrong. In addition to eventually reaching the Hall of Fame, Larkin was awarded the Roberto Clemente Award in 1993, the Lou Gehrig Memorial Award in 1994, and named the National League Most Valuable Player in 1995.

Cincinnati has made ten selections in the supplemental round of the draft, but has never held the first overall pick. They have also had two compensatory picks since the first draft in 1965. These additional picks are provided when a team loses a particularly valuable free agent in the previous off-season,^{[V]} or, more recently, if a team fails to sign a draft pick from the previous year. The Reds have failed to sign their first-round pick twice. Mike Miley, selected in 1971, chose to attend college at Louisiana State University; he would later be drafted by the California Angels in 1974. The Reds did not receive a compensatory pick for failing to sign Miley. Jeremy Sowers, the Reds' 2001 choice, decided to attend Vanderbilt University, and was selected in the first round of the 2004 draft by the Cleveland Indians. Sowers' MLB debut came in 2006 against Cincinnati. For failing to sign Sowers, the Reds received the 40th pick in the 2002 draft, which they used to select Mark Schramek.

== Key ==
Year	Links to an article about that year's Major League Baseball draft
Position	Indicates the secondary/collegiate position at which the player was drafted, rather than the professional position the player went on to play
Pick	Indicates the number of the pick
*	Player did not sign with the Reds
§	Indicates a supplemental pick
†	Member of the National Baseball Hall of Fame
'90	Player was a member of the Reds' 1990 championship team
'75 '76	Player was a member of the Reds' 1975 and 1976 championship teams.

== Picks ==
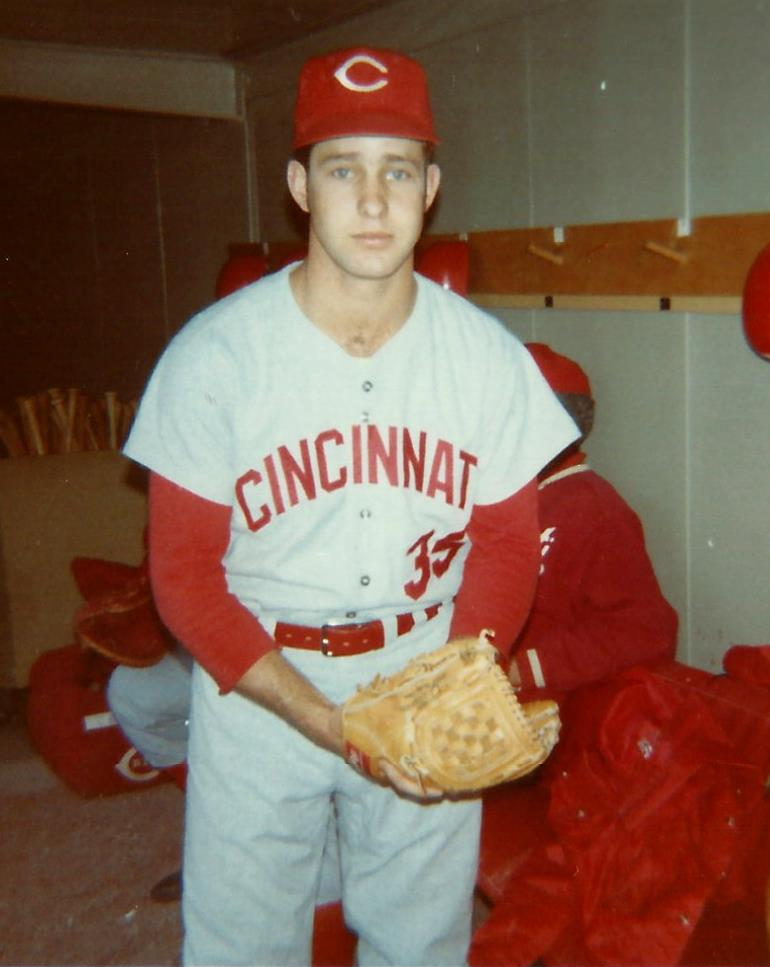
Don Gullett (1969) won the World Series with the Reds in 1975 and 1976.

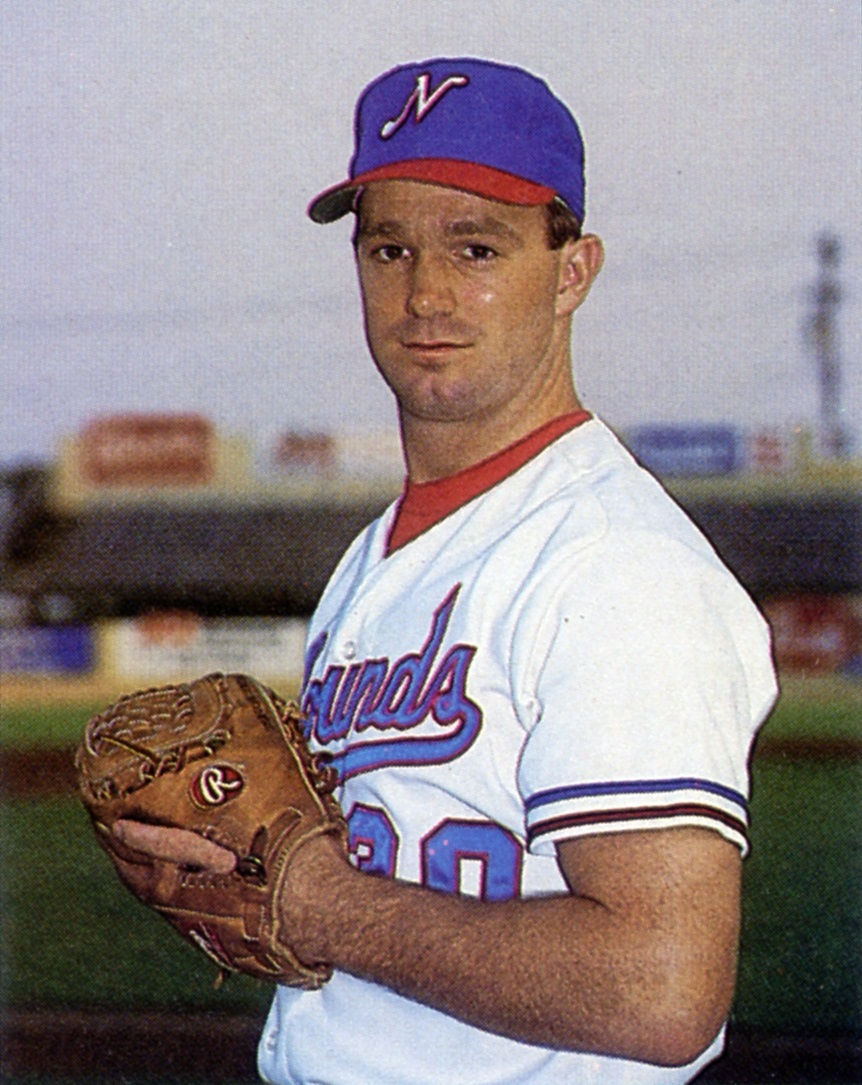
Pat Pacillo (1984) was only the second player the Reds drafted in the first round out of college.

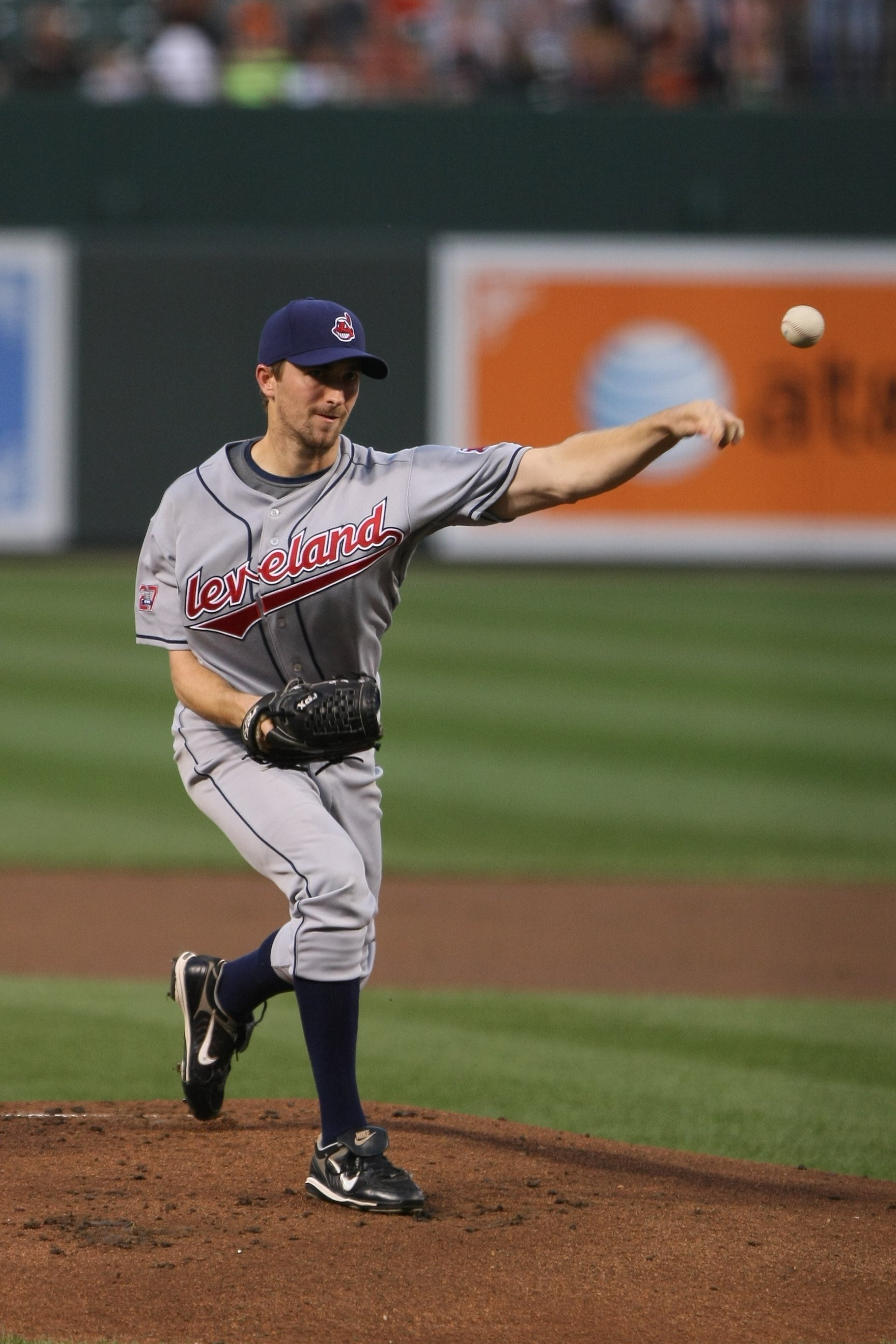
Jeremy Sowers (2001) is one of four picks the Reds were unable to sign.

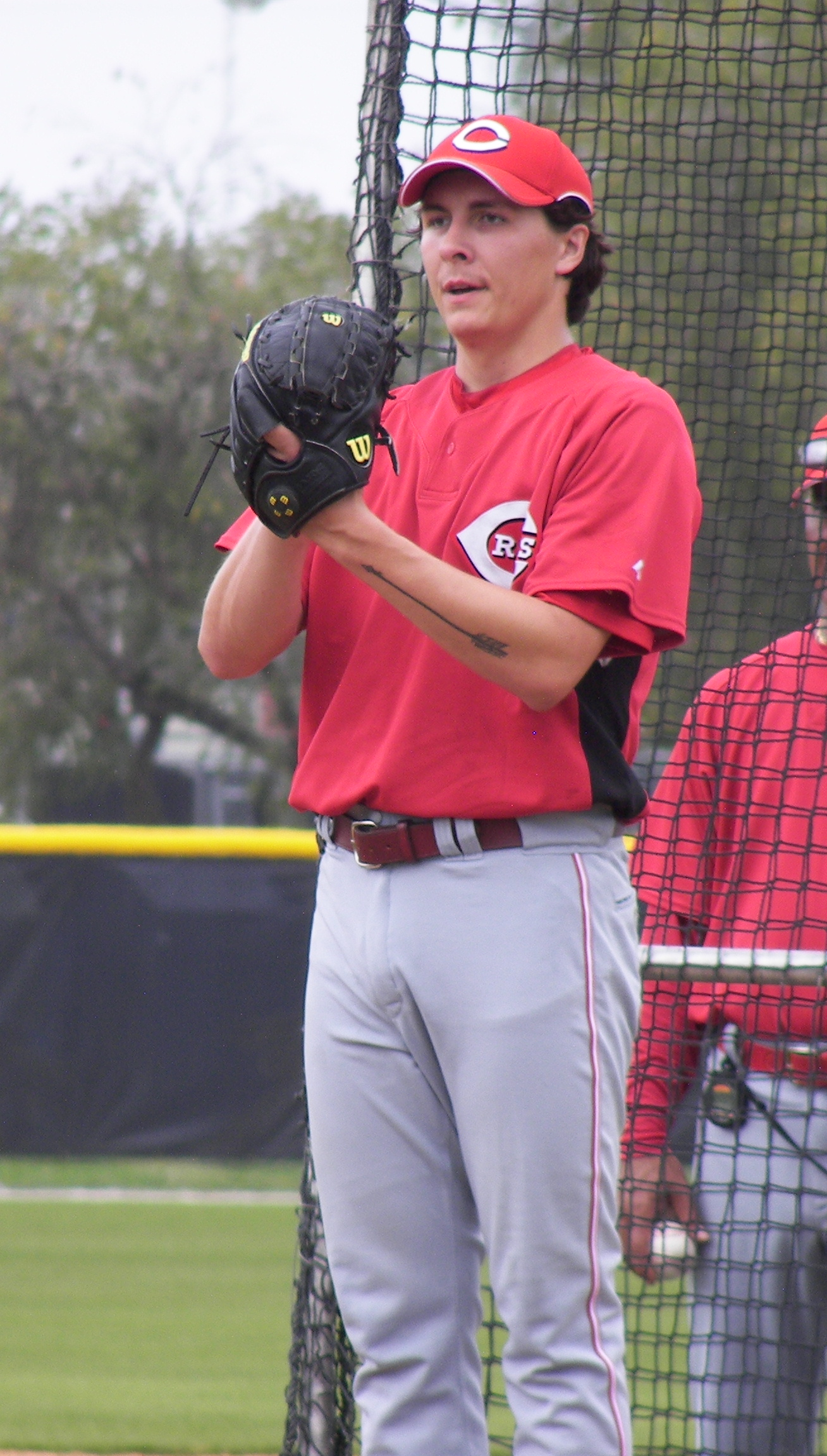
When Homer Bailey (2004) made his MLB debut in 2007, he was the youngest player in the National League.

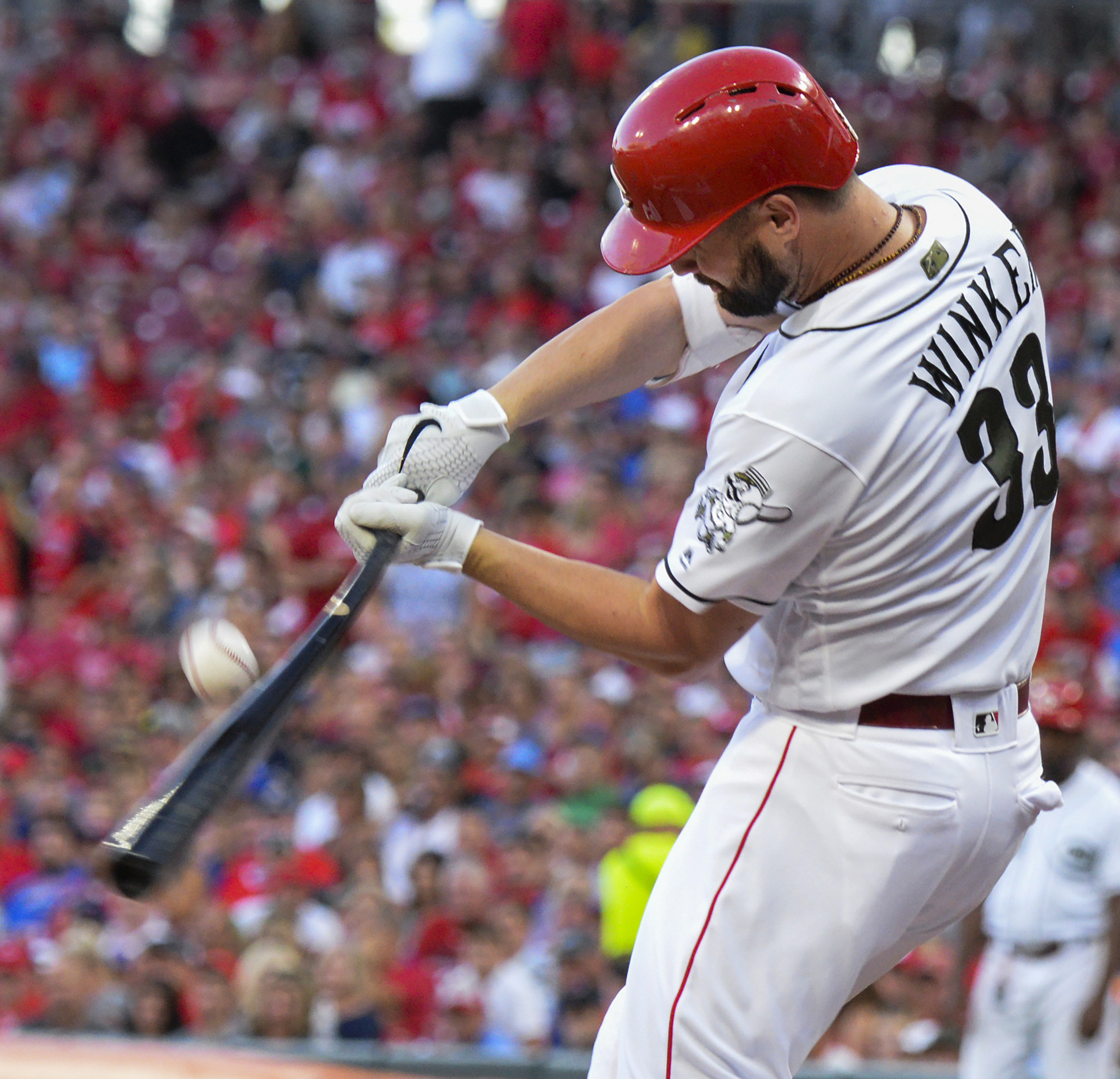
Jesse Winker was the only one of the team's three first-round picks in 2012 who reached the major leagues.

Year	Name	Position	School (Location)	Pick	Ref
1965	Bernie Carbo	Third baseman	Livonia High School (Livonia, Michigan)	16	
1966	Gary Nolan '75 '76	Right-handed pitcher	Oroville High School (Oroville, California)	13	
1967	Wayne Simpson	Right-handed pitcher	Centennial High School (Compton, California)	8	
1968	Timothy Grant	Right-handed pitcher	Riverview High School (Boykins, Virginia)	13	
1969	Don Gullett '75 '76	Left-handed pitcher	McKell High School (South Shore, Kentucky)	14	
1970	Gary Polczynski	Shortstop	Nathan Hale High School (West Allis, Wisconsin)	15	
1971	Mike Miley*	Shortstop	East Jefferson High School (Kenner, Louisiana)	24	
1972	Larry Paine	Right-handed pitcher	Huntsville High School (Huntsville, Texas)	7	
1973	Bradford Kessler	Outfielder	Claremont High School (Claremont, California)	22	
1974	Steve Reed	Right-handed pitcher	Fort Wayne High School (Fort Wayne, Indiana)	23	
1975	Tony Moretto	Outfielder	William Henry Harrison High School (Evansville, Indiana)	22	
1976	Mark King	Right-handed pitcher	Owensboro High School (Owensboro, Kentucky)	23	
1977	Tad Venger	Third baseman	Hart High School (Newhall, California)	24	
1978	Nick Esasky	Shortstop	Carol City High School (Opa-locka, Florida)	17	
1979	Dan Lamar	Catcher	Bellaire High School (Houston, Texas)	20^{[a]}	
1979	Mike Sullivan	Right-handed pitcher	Clemson University (Clemson, South Carolina)	22	
1980	Ron Robinson	Right-handed pitcher	Woodlake High School (Woodlake, California)	19	
1981	no first-round pick^{[b]}				
1982	Scott Jones	Left-handed pitcher	Hinsdale South High School (Hinsdale, Illinois)	22^{[c]}	
1982	Billy Hawley	Right-handed pitcher	Brookland-Cayce High School (West Columbia, South Carolina)	23	
1982	Robert Jones*	First baseman	Proviso East High School (Maywood, Illinois)	28§^{[d]}	
1983	Kurt Stillwell	Shortstop	Thousand Oaks High School (Thousand Oaks, California)	2	
1984	Pat Pacillo	Right-handed pitcher	Seton Hall University (South Orange, New Jersey)	5	
1985	Barry Larkin^{†} '90	Shortstop	University of Michigan (Ann Arbor, Michigan)	4	
1986	Scott Scudder '90	Right-handed pitcher	Prairiland High School (Blossom, Texas)	17	
1987	Jack Armstrong '90	Right-handed pitcher	University of Oklahoma (Norman, Oklahoma)	18	
1988	no first-round pick^{[e]}				
1989	Scott Bryant	Outfielder	University of Texas at Austin (Austin, Texas)	20	
1990	Dan Wilson	Catcher	University of Minnesota (Minneapolis, Minnesota)	7	
1991	Pokey Reese	Shortstop	Lower Richland High School (Hopkins, South Carolina)	20	
1992	Chad Mottola	Outfielder	University of Central Florida (Orlando, Florida)	5	
1993	Pat Watkins	Outfielder	East Carolina University (Greenville, North Carolina)	32§^{[f]}	
1994	C. J. Nitkowski	Left-handed pitcher	St. John's University (Jamaica, New York)	9	
1995	no first-round pick^{[g]}				
1996	John Oliver	Outfielder	Lake-Lehman Junior/Senior High School (Lehman Township, Pennsylvania)	25	
1996	Matt McClendon*	Right-handed pitcher	University of Florida (Gainesville, Florida)	33§^{[h]}	
1997	Brandon Larson	Shortstop	Louisiana State University (Baton Rouge, Louisiana)	14	
1998	Austin Kearns	Outfielder	Lafayette High School (Lexington, Kentucky)	7	
1999	Ty Howington	Left-handed pitcher	Hudson's Bay High School (Vancouver, Washington)	14	
2000	David Espinosa	Shortstop	Miami Coral Park High School (Miami, Florida)	23	
2000	Dustin Moseley	Right-handed pitcher	Arkansas High School (Texarkana, Arkansas)	34§^{[i]}	
2001	Jeremy Sowers*	Left-handed pitcher	Ballard High School (Ballard, Kentucky)	20	
2002	Christopher Gruler	Right-handed pitcher	Liberty High School (Oakley, California)	3	
2002	Mark Schramek	Third baseman	University of Texas at Austin (Austin, Texas)	40§^{[j]}	
2003	Ryan Wagner	Right-handed pitcher	University of Houston (Houston, Texas)	14	
2004	Homer Bailey	Right-handed pitcher	La Grange High School (La Grange, Texas)	7	
2005	Jay Bruce	Outfielder	West Brook Senior High School (Beaumont, Texas)	12	
2006	Drew Stubbs	Outfielder	University of Texas at Austin (Austin, Texas)	8	
2007	Devin Mesoraco	Catcher	Punxsutawney Area High School (Punxsutawney, Pennsylvania)	15	
2007	Todd Frazier	Third baseman	Rutgers University (New Brunswick, New Jersey)	34§^{[k]}	
2007	Kyle Lotzkar	Right-handed pitcher	South Delta Secondary School (Delta, British Columbia)	53§^{[l]}	
2008	Yonder Alonso	First baseman	University of Miami (Coral Gables, Florida)	7	
2009	Mike Leake	Right-handed pitcher	Arizona State University (Tempe, Arizona)	8	
2009	Brad Boxberger	Right-handed pitcher	University of Southern California (Los Angeles, California)	43§^{[m]}	
2010	Yasmani Grandal	Catcher	University of Miami (Coral Gables, Florida)	12	
2011	Robert Stephenson	Right-handed pitcher	Alhambra High School (Martinez, California)	27	
2012	Nick Travieso	Right-handed pitcher	Archbishop Edward A. McCarthy High School (Southwest Ranches, Florida)	14	
2012	Jesse Winker	Outfielder	Olympia High School (Orlando, Florida)	49§^{[n]}	
2012	Jeff Gelalich	Outfielder	University of California, Los Angeles (Los Angeles, California)	57§^{[o]}	
2013	Phillip Ervin	Outfielder	Samford University (Homewood, Alabama)	27	
2013	Michael Lorenzen	Right-handed pitcher	California State University, Fullerton (Fullerton, California)	38	
2014	Nick Howard	Right-handed pitcher	University of Virginia (Charlottesville, Virginia)	19	
2014	Alex Blandino	Shortstop	Stanford University (Palo Alto, California)	29^{[p]}	
2015	Tyler Stephenson	Catcher	Kennesaw Mountain High School (Kennesaw, Georgia)	11	
2016	Nick Senzel	Third Baseman	University of Tennessee (Knoxville, Tennessee)	2	
2016	Taylor Trammell	Outfielder	Mount Paran Christian School (Kennesaw, Georgia)	35	
2017	Hunter Greene	Right-handed pitcher / Shortstop	Notre Dame High School (Sherman Oaks, California)	2	
2017	Jeter Downs	Shortstop	Monsignor Edward Pace High School (Miami Gardens, Florida)	32	
2018	Jonathan India	Third Baseman	University of Florida (Gainesville, Florida)	5	
2019	Nick Lodolo	Left-handed pitcher	Texas Christian University (Fort Worth, Texas)	7	
2020	Austin Hendrick	Outfielder	West Allegheny Senior High School (Imperial, Pennsylvania)	12	
2021	Matt McLain	Shortstop	UCLA (Los Angeles, California)	17	
2021	Jay Allen	Outfielder	John Carroll Catholic High School (Fort Pierce, Florida)	30§	
2022	Cam Collier	Third baseman	Chipola College (Marianna, Florida)	18	
2022	Sal Stewart	Third baseman	Westminster Christian School (Palmetto Bay, Florida)	32§	
2023	Rhett Lowder	Right-handed pitcher	Wake Forest University (Winston-Salem, North Carolina)	7	
2023	Ty Floyd	Right-handed pitcher	LSU (Baton Rouge, Louisiana)	38§	
2024	Chase Burns	Right-handed pitcher	Wake Forest University (Winston-Salem, North Carolina)	2	
2025	Steele Hall	Shortstop	Hewitt-Trussville High School (Trussville, Alabama)	9	
2026	Justin Lebron	Shortstop	University of Alabama (Tuscaloosa, Alabama)	18	

== See also ==
- Cincinnati Reds minor league players

== Footnotes ==
- ^{V} Through the 2012 draft, free agents were evaluated by the Elias Sports Bureau and rated "Type A", "Type B", or not compensation-eligible. If a team offered arbitration to a player but that player refused and subsequently signed with another team, the original team was able to receive additional draft picks. If a "Type A" free agent left in this way, his previous team received a supplemental pick and a compensatory pick from the team with which he signed. If a "Type B" free agent left in this way, his previous team received only a supplemental pick. Since the 2013 draft, free agents are no longer classified by type; instead, compensatory picks are only awarded if the team offered its free agent a contract worth at least the average of the 125 current richest MLB contracts. However, if the free agent's last team acquired the player in a trade during the last year of his contract, it is ineligible to receive compensatory picks for that player.
- ^{a} The Reds gained a compensatory first-round pick in 1979 from the Philadelphia Phillies for losing free agent Pete Rose.
- ^{b} The Reds lost their first-round pick in 1981 to the Chicago Cubs as compensation for signing free agent Larry Biittner.
- ^{c} The Reds gained a compensatory first-round pick in 1982 from the New York Yankees for losing free agent Dave Collins.
- ^{d} The Reds gained a supplemental first-round pick in 1982 for losing free agent Dave Collins.
- ^{e} The Reds lost their first-round pick in 1988 to the San Francisco Giants as compensation for signing free agent Eddie Milner.
- ^{f} The Reds gained a supplemental first-round pick in 1993 for losing free agent Greg Swindell. They had lost their original first-round pick in 1993 to the Minnesota Twins as compensation for signing free agent John Smiley.
- ^{g} The Reds lost their first-round pick in 1995 to the Boston Red Sox as compensation for signing free agent Damon Berryhill.
- ^{h} The Reds gained a supplemental first-round pick in 1996 for losing free agent Ron Gant.
- ^{i} The Reds gained a supplemental first-round pick in 2000 for losing free agent Juan Guzmán.
- ^{j} The Reds gained a supplemental first-round pick in 2002 for failing to sign 2001 first-round pick Jeremy Sowers.
- ^{k} The Reds gained a supplemental first-round pick in 2007 for losing free agent Rich Aurilia.
- ^{l} The Reds gained a supplemental first-round pick in 2007 for losing free agent Scott Schoeneweis.
- ^{m} The Reds gained a supplemental first-round pick in 2009 for losing free agent Jeremy Affeldt.
- ^{n} The Reds gained a supplemental first-round pick in 2012 for losing free agent Ramón Hernández.
- ^{o} The Reds gained a supplemental first-round pick in 2012 for losing free agent Francisco Cordero.
- ^{p} The Reds gained a compensatory first-round pick in 2014 for losing free agent Shin-Soo Choo.
