= Cincinnati Reds minor league players =

List of baseball players

Below are the rosters of the minor league affiliates of the Cincinnati Reds and short biographies on some of the top prospects in the organization:

== Players ==
=== Jay Allen ===
Jay Allen
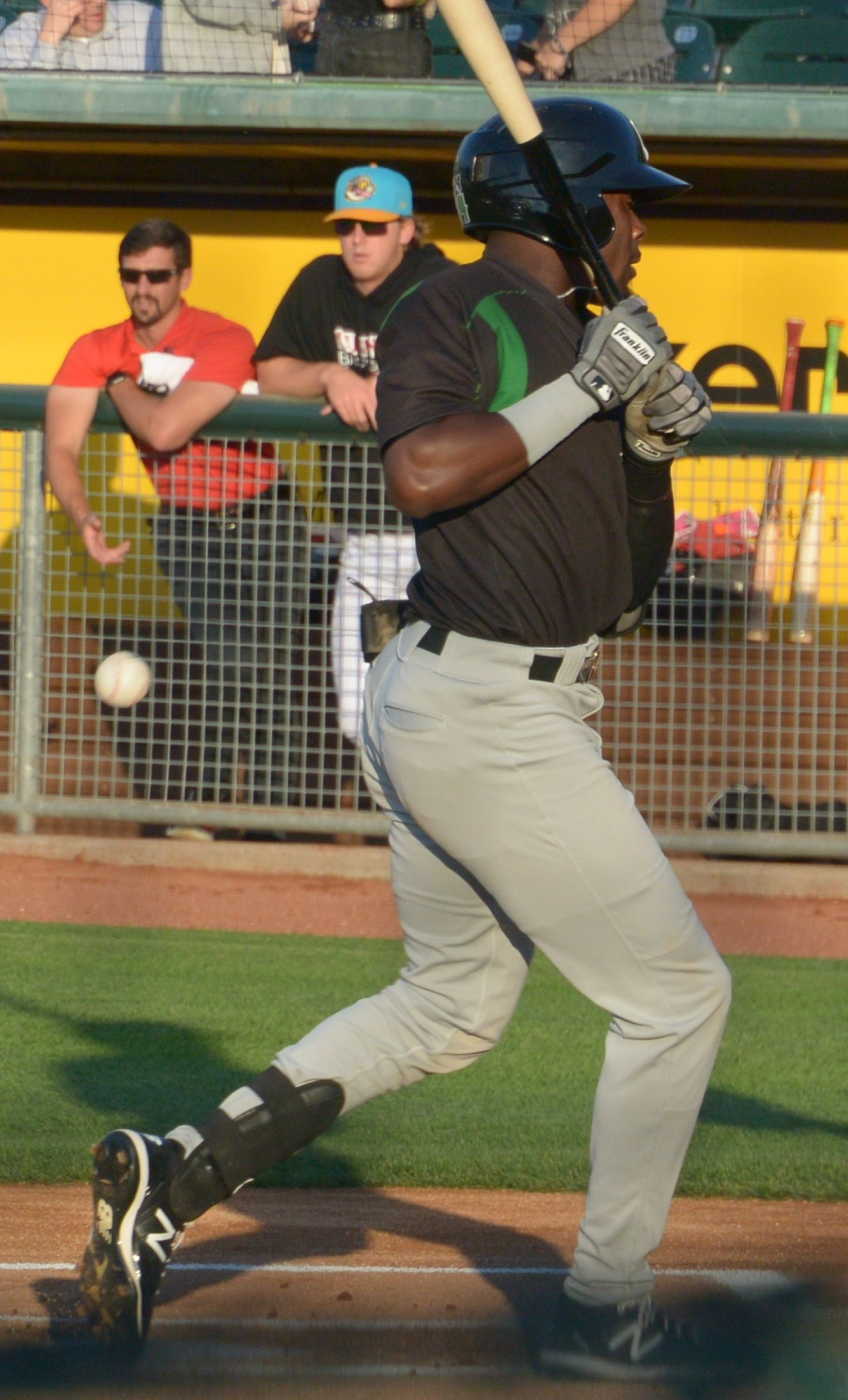
- Allen with the Dayton Dragons in 2022

Cincinnati Reds
- Outfielder
- Born: November 22, 2002 (age 23); Fort Pierce, Florida, U.S.
- Bats: Right Throws: Right

Jay Frederick Allen II (born November 22, 2002) is an American professional baseball outfielder for the Cincinnati Reds organization. Listed at 6 feet 3 inches (1.91 m) and 190 pounds (86 kg), he bats and throws right-handed.

Allen played high school baseball, football, and basketball at John Carroll Catholic High School in Fort Pierce, Florida. Allen committed to play college baseball for the Florida Gators.

Allen was selected in the 2021 Major League Baseball draft by the Cincinnati Reds as the final selection of the first round; he was the 30th player selected and the Reds' second selection of the first round, as the Reds had received a compensatory pick due to the Los Angeles Dodgers signing Trevor Bauer. Allen signed with the Reds on July 20, 2021, for a $2.4 million signing bonus.

Allen made his professional debut with the Rookie-level Arizona Complex League Reds, slashing .328/.440/.557 with three home runs, 11 RBI, and 14 stolen bases over 19 games. He opened the 2022 season with the Daytona Tortugas of the Single-A Florida State League.

During the 2023 season, Allen missed three months due to a torn thumb ligament; when healthy, he batted .163/.320/.250 with two home runs, four RBI, and 16 stolen bases in 31 games for the ACL Reds and High-A Dayton Dragons. He returned to Dayton in 2024, playing in 109 games and hitting .224/.372/.345 with 10 home runs, 40 RBI, and 35 stolen bases.

Allen made 118 appearances for the Double-A Chattanooga Lookouts in 2025, slashing .227/.308/.343 with eight home runs, 60 RBI, and 21 stolen bases.

- Career statistics from MLB · Baseball Reference (Minors)
- Profile at MaxPreps

=== Ty Floyd ===
Ty Floyd

Cincinnati Reds
- Pitcher
- Born: August 28, 2001 (age 25); Rome, Georgia, U.S.
- Bats: Right Throws: Right

Joseph Tyson Floyd (born August 28, 2001) is an American professional baseball pitcher in the Cincinnati Reds organization.

Floyd grew up in Rockmart, Georgia and attended Rockmart High School. He was named the Class 7AA Georgia Player of the Year as a junior after posting a 10–1 record with a 0.57 ERA and 127 strikeouts.

Floyd made 20 pitching appearances, all in relief, during his freshman season with the LSU Tigers and had a 4.44 ERA and 39 strikeouts over 24 1/3 innings pitched. After the season, he played summer collegiate baseball for the Bristol State Liners of the Appalachian League. Floyd pitched in 16 games with 10 starts as a sophomore and went 5–4 with a 3.77 ERA and 70 strikeouts. Floyd finished his junior season with a 7–0 record and 4.35 ERA with 120 strikeouts as LSU won the 2023 Men's College World Series (MCWS). He set a MCWS record with 17 strikeouts in the first game of the finals against Florida.

Floyd was selected by the Cincinnati Reds with the 38th pick of the 2023 Major League Baseball draft. He signed with the Reds on July 16, 2023, for $2,097,500.

Floyd made his professional debut in 2025 with the Daytona Tortugas, pitching to a 0–1 record and 3.25 ERA over eight starts. On July 6, he was placed on the full-season injured list ending his season.

- Career statistics from Baseball Reference (Minors)

=== Carter Graham ===
Carter Graham

Cincinnati Reds
- First baseman
- Born: September 17, 2001 (age 25); Northridge, California, U.S.
- Bats: Right Throws: Right

Carter Michael Graham (born September 17, 2001) is an American professional baseball first baseman in the Cincinnati Reds organization.

Graham attended Chaminade College Preparatory School in West Hills, California and played three seasons of college baseball at Stanford University for the Cardinal. In 2022, he played collegiate summer baseball in the Cape Cod Baseball League with the Wareham Gatemen. In 2023, his junior year for the Cardinal, he appeared in 64 games and batted .315 with 15 home runs and 77 RBI.

Graham was selected by the Cincinnati Reds in the ninth round of the 2023 Major League Baseball draft and signed for $212,900. He made his professional debut after signing with the Rookie-level Arizona Complex League Reds and also played with the Single-A Daytona Tortugas, hitting .205 across 15 games played. He split the 2024 season between Daytona and the High-A Dayton Dragons and batted .215 with eight home runs and 40 RBI in 83 games. Graham returned to both Daytona and Dayton for the 2025 season and hit .240 with nine home runs and 42 RBI across 101 games. To begin 2026, he returned to Dayton for the third straight season before he was promoted to the Double-A Chattanooga Lookouts. Across 126 games between the two teams, Graham batted .300 with 29 home runs and 93 RBI. After the season, he was assigned to play in the Arizona Fall League with the Peoria Javelinas. On November 17, 2026, the Reds added Graham to their 40-man roster to protect him from the Rule 5 draft.

- Career statistics from Baseball Reference (Minors)
- Stanford Cardinal bio

=== Luke Hayden ===
Luke Hayden

Cincinnati Reds
- Pitcher
- Born: December 5, 2002 (age 23); Bloomington, Indiana, U.S.
- Bats: Right Throws: Right

Luke Michael Hayden (born December 5, 2002) is an American professional baseball pitcher in the Cincinnati Reds organization.

Hayden attended Edgewood High School in Ellettsville, Indiana, where he played baseball and graduated in 2021. He went unselected in the 2021 Major League Baseball draft and enrolled at Indiana University to play college baseball for the Indiana Hoosiers. After two seasons at Indiana, Hayden transferred to Indiana State University to play for the Sycamores. In his lone season for the Sycamores in 2024, he started 16 games and went 7–2 with a 3.81 ERA and 91 strikeouts over 78 innings. Hayden was then selected by the Cincinnati Reds in the eighth round of the 2024 Major League Baseball draft. He signed for $197,500, forgoing his commitment to transfer to Louisiana State University.

After signing, Hayden made his professional debut with the Daytona Tortugas, appearing in four games for the season. In 2025, he was a non-roster invitee to spring training and was named to Cincinnati's Spring Breakout roster. Hayden was assigned to the Dayton Dragons for the 2025 season. He started 24 games for Dayton, going 4–7 with a 4.09 ERA and 79 strikeouts, holding batters to a .228 batting average. Hayden was assigned to play in the Arizona Fall League with the Peoria Javelinas after the season. In 2026, he played with the Arizona Complex League Reds, Daytona, Dayton, and the Chattanooga Lookouts and had a 4–5 record, a 6.01 ERA, and 89 strikeouts across 76 1/3 innings between the four teams.

- Career statistics from Baseball Reference (Minors)
- Indiana State Sycamores bio

=== Luke Holman ===
Luke Holman

Cincinnati Reds
- Pitcher
- Born: January 6, 2003 (age 23); Reading, Pennsylvania, U.S.
- Bats: Right Throws: Right

Luke Kenneth Holman (born January 6, 2003) is an American professional baseball pitcher in the Cincinnati Reds organization.

Holman attended Wilson High School in West Lawn, Pennsylvania, where he played baseball. As a senior in 2021, he pitched to a 7–1 record, a 0.88 ERA, and 113 strikeouts over 55 2/3 innings. He was selected by the Toronto Blue Jays in the 20th round of the 2021 Major League Baseball draft, but did not sign and instead enrolled at the University of Alabama to play college baseball for the Alabama Crimson Tide.

As a freshman at Alabama in 2022, Holman appeared in 15 games in relief, going 0–2 with a 5.68 ERA over 19 innings. He moved into the starting rotation as a sophomore in 2023 and went 7–4 with a 3.67 ERA over 15 starts. After the season, he transferred to Louisiana State University (LSU). He was also selected to play for the Team USA Collegiate National Baseball Team. Holman started 16 games for LSU in 2024 and went 9–4 with a 2.75 ERA and 127 strikeouts over 91 2/3 innings.

Holman was selected by the Cincinnati Reds with the 71st overall pick in the 2024 Major League Baseball draft. On July 23, 2024, Holman signed with the Reds on a contract worth $997,000. He made his professional debut in 2025 with the Daytona Tortugas. After two starts, he was placed on the 7-day injured list before being transferred to the full-season injured list, thus ending his season. Holman underwent Tommy John surgery shortly after, and began the 2026 season on the 60-day injured list while recovering. He pitched in a total of four games for the year and had a 2.70 ERA and nine strikeouts. After the season, Holman was assigned to play in the Arizona Fall League with the Peoria Javelinas. He was named to the Fall Stars Game.

Holman was diagnosed with anaplastic large-cell lymphoma when he was seven and underwent chemotherapy for one year before returning to baseball.

- LSU Tigers bio
- Career statistics from Baseball Reference (Minors)

=== Bryce Hubbart ===
Bryce Hubbart

Cincinnati Reds
- Pitcher
- Born: June 28, 2001 (age 25); Peoria, Illinois, U.S.
- Bats: Left Throws: Left

Bryce Thomas Hubbart (born June 28, 2001) is an American professional baseball pitcher in the Cincinnati Reds organization.

Hubbart attended Windermere High School in Orlando, Florida. As a senior in 2019, he went 9–0 with a 0.73 ERA and 96 strikeouts over 57 2/3 innings. He went unselected in the 2019 Major League Baseball draft and enrolled at Florida State University to play college baseball.

As a freshman at Florida State in 2020, Hubbart pitched 8 1/3 innings in which he gave up six earned runs, eight walks, and compiled 13 strikeouts before the remainder of the season was cancelled due to the COVID-19 pandemic. That summer, he played collegiate summer baseball with the Winter Garden Squeeze of the Florida Collegiate Summer League. In 2021, Hubbart appeared in 16 games (making 14 starts) in which he went 6–5 with a 3.80 ERA and 94 strikeouts over 71 innings. After the season, he played in the Cape Cod Baseball League with the Brewster Whitecaps, where he posted an 0.87 ERA and 45 strikeouts over 31 innings and earned All-Star honors. Hubbart entered the 2022 season as a top prospect for the upcoming draft. He was named Florida State's number two starter behind Parker Messick. In his first start of the season versus the James Madison Dukes, he threw five scoreless innings in which he walked zero batters while striking out 13. He was subsequently named the Atlantic Coast Conference Pitcher of the Week. At the end of the regular season, he was named to the All-ACC Second Team. Over 15 starts, he went 8–3 with a 3.32 ERA and 96 strikeouts over 76 innings. Following the season's end, he traveled to San Diego where he participated in the Draft Combine.

Hubbart was drafted by the Cincinnati Reds in the third round with the 94th overall selection of the 2022 Major League Baseball draft. He signed with the team for $520,500.

Hubbart made his professional debut with the Arizona Complex League Reds and was later promoted to the Daytona Tortugas. Over 7 1/3 innings, he gave up one run while striking out 12 batters and walking six. He returned to Daytona for the 2023 season, going 1–3 with a 4.96 ERA and 51 strikeouts over 45 1/3 innings. Hubbart was selected to play in the Arizona Fall League with the Surprise Saguaros. He was assigned to the Dayton Dragons to open the 2024 season and also appeared in three games for the Chattanooga Lookouts, pitching to a 4–6 record and 5.42 ERA over 23 games between both teams. In 2025, Hubbart played with both Daytona and Dayton, going 4–0 with a 5.09 ERA and 52 strikeouts over 46 innings. He played the 2026 season with Daytona, Dayton, Chattanooga, and the Louisville Bats and had a 2–3 record, a 7.16 ERA, and 54 strikeouts over 44 innings.

- Florida State Seminoles bio
- Career statistics from MLB · Baseball Reference (Minors)

=== Tyson Lewis ===
Tyson Lewis

Cincinnati Reds
- Shortstop
- Born: January 10, 2006 (age 20); Omaha, Nebraska, U.S.
- Bats: Left Throws: Right

Tyson John Lewis (born January 10, 2006) is an American professional baseball shortstop in the Cincinnati Reds organization.

Lewis attended Millard West High School in Omaha, Nebraska. As a senior, he was the Nebraska Gatorade Baseball Player of the Year after hitting .496 with eight home runs, 41 runs batted in (RBI) and 31 stolen bases. Lewis was selected by the Cincinnati Reds in the second round of the 2024 Major League Baseball draft. He signed with the team for $3 million, forgoing his commitment to play college baseball at the University of Arkansas.

Lewis made his professional debut in 2025 with the Arizona Complex League Reds. In July, he was promoted to the Single-A Daytona Tortugas, with whom he ended the season. Over 81 games between the two teams, he hit .311 with nine home runs, 54 RBI, and 27 stolen bases. Lewis returned to Daytona to open the 2026 season. In June, he was promoted to the High-A Dayton Dragons. Across 103 games, Lewis batted .258 with 11 home runs, 48 RBI, and 21 stolen bases.

- Career statistics from Baseball Reference (Minors)

=== Ryjeteri Merite ===
Ryjeteri Merite

Cincinnati Reds
- Pitcher
- Born: December 16, 2005 (age 20); Rotterdam, Netherlands
- Bats: Left Throws: Left

Ryjeteri Glino Gregory Merite (born December 16, 2005) is a Curaçaoan-Dutch professional baseball pitcher in the Cincinnati Reds organization.

Merite was born in Rotterdam in the Netherlands but grew up in Curaçao. He would sign as an international free agent by the Cincinnati Reds in December 2023 and started his professional career in the Dominican Summer League. However, he missed most of the 2024 season due to an injury. In 2025, Merite played in 14 games with 11 starts in 33.1 innings, pitching to a 0.81 ERA. He was assigned to the Arizona Complex League for the 2026 season.

Merite was named to the Netherlands national baseball team for the 2026 World Baseball Classic. In his first game, he pitched a scoreless inning against eventual champions Venezuela.

- Career statistics from Baseball Reference (Minors)

=== Mason Neville ===
Mason Neville

Cincinnati Reds
- Outfielder
- Born: January 13, 2004 (age 22); Henderson, Nevada, U.S.
- Bats: Left Throws: Left

Mason Evan Neville (born January 13, 2004) is an American professional baseball outfielder in the Cincinnati Reds organization. He was selected by the Reds in the fourth round, with the 114th overall pick, of the 2025 Major League Baseball draft. He previously played for the Oregon Ducks

Neville attended Basic High School in Henderson, Nevada. He committed to play college baseball at the University of Arkansas. He was selected by the Cincinnati Reds in the 18th round of the 2022 Major League Baseball draft, but did not sign with the Reds and attended Arkansas.

As a freshman at Arkansas in 2023, he played in 19 games with seven starts and hit .111 with two runs batted in (RBI) over 27 at bats. After the season, he entered the transfer portal and transferred to the University of Oregon. In his first year at Oregon in 2024, he started 36 of 56 games and hit .268/.369/.664 with 16 home runs and 43 RBI over 149 at bats. In 2024, he played collegiate summer baseball with the Bourne Braves of the Cape Cod Baseball League. Neville returned to Oregon as a full-time starter his junior year in 2025.

Neville was selected by the Cincinnati Reds in the fourth round, with the 114th overall selection, of the 2025 Major League Baseball draft. On July 21, Neville signed a $697 thousand signing bonus with the Reds.

- Career statistics from Baseball Reference (Minors)
- Oregon Ducks bio

=== Kien Vu ===
Kien Vu

Cincinnati Reds
- Outfielder
- Born: October 13, 2003 (age 23); Houston, Texas, U.S.
- Bats: Left Throws: Left

Kien Makai Vu (born October 13, 2003) is an American professional baseball outfielder in the Cincinnati Reds organization.

Vu attended Point Loma High School in San Diego, California. He committed to play college baseball at Arizona State. Over his three seasons at Arizona State he recorded 25 home runs, a .351 batting average, a .609 slugging percentage, a 1.062 OPS, a .453 OBP, and a 0.991 fielding percentage. In 2024, he played collegiate summer baseball with the Cotuit Kettleers of the Cape Cod Baseball League.

In the 2025 MLB draft, Vu was selected 264th overall by the Cincinnati Reds. During the 2025 season he played with the ACL Reds and the Daytona Tortugas, where he was named FSL Player of the Week for the week of August 17. He was assigned to the Dayton Dragons to start off the 2026 season.

- Career statistics from Baseball Reference (Minors)

=== Aaron Watson ===
Aaron Watson

Cincinnati Reds
- Pitcher
- Born: January 5, 2007 (age 19); Jacksonville, Florida, U.S.
- Bats: Right Throws: Right

Aaron Curtis Watson (born January 5, 2007) is an American professional baseball pitcher in the Cincinnati Reds organization.

Watson attended Trinity Christian Academy in Jacksonville, Florida. As a senior in 2025, he pitched a perfect game. He was selected by the Cincinnati Reds in the second round of the 2025 Major League Baseball draft. He signed with the team, forgoing his commitment to play college baseball at the University of Florida.

Watson made his professional debut in 2026 with the Arizona Complex League Reds.

- Career statistics from Baseball Reference (Minors)

== Full Triple-A to Rookie League rosters ==
=== Triple-A ===
Louisville Bats roster
Players		Coaches/Other
Pitchers: 37 Kevin Abel; 21 Jose Acuna; 39 Julian Aguiar *; 18 Sam Benschoter; 40 Kent Emanuel *; 31 Brandon Leibrandt *; 32 Jared Lyons; 7 Kyle Nicolas *; 49 Hunter Parks; -- Ben Wereski	Catchers: 20 Dayne Leonard; 26 Michael Trautwein; Infielders: 17 Dominic Pitelli; Outfielders: 22 Jay Allen II; 30 Will Benson *; 23 Rece Hinds *	Manager: 33 Pat Kelly; Coaches: 46 Reid Cornelius (pitching); 25 Vince Harrison (coach); 28 Carson Phillips (pitching); 6 Peterson Plaz (coach); 55 Daryle Ward (hitting); 7-day injured list; * On Cincinnati Reds 40-man roster; ~ Development list; # Rehab assignment; ∞ Reserve list; ‡ Restricted list; § Suspended list; † Temporarily inactive list; Roster updated November 17, 2026; Transactions; → More rosters: MiLB • International League; → Cincinnati Reds minor league players

=== Double-A ===
Chattanooga Lookouts roster
Players		Coaches/Other
Pitchers: 29 Cody Adcock; 35 Beau Blanchard; 31 Will Cannon; 18 Thomas Farr; 38 Johnathan Harmon; 20 Luke Hayden; 1 Bryce Hubbart; 9 Anyer Laureano; 22 Nate Peterson; 8 Stephen Quigley; 13 Javi Rivera; 15 Nick Sando	Catchers: 44 Alfredo Duno; 45 Cade Hunter; Infielders: 6 Cam Collier; 2 Trey Faltine; 54 Ruben Ibarra; 19 Steffon Moore; 2 Carlos Sanchez; 10 Peyton Stovall; Outfielders: 27 Yerlin Confidan; -- Shane Sasaki	Manager: 24 Jose Moreno; Coaches: 25 Joel Bonnett (pitching); 17 Mike Jacobs (hitting); 33 Caleb Longley (assistant hitting); 21 Reggie Williams (coach); 7-day injured list; * On Cincinnati Reds 40-man roster; ~ Development list; # Rehab assignment; ∞ Reserve list; ‡ Restricted list; § Suspended list; † Temporarily inactive list; Roster updated November 16, 2026; Transactions; → More rosters: MiLB • Southern League; → Cincinnati Reds minor league players

=== High-A ===
Dayton Dragons roster
Players		Coaches/Other
Pitchers: 36 Brady Afthim; 22 Bryce Archie; 26 Edgar Colon; 31 Reynardo Cruz; 24 Victor Diaz; 21 Trent Hodgdon; 32 Jordan Little; 39 David Lorduy; 17 Kyle McCoy; 18 Jose Montero; 37 Mason Morris; 11 JeanPierre Ortiz; 28 Graham Osman; 34 Drew Pestka; 20 Jimmy Romano; 31 Andrew Shaffner; 27 Cole Schoenwetter; 33 Stharlin Torres; 14 Deivi Villafana	Catchers: 12 John Michael Faile; 3 Jacob Friend; 7 Ryan McCrystal; -- Diego Omana; Infielders: 2 Alfredo Alcantara; 5 Johnny Ascanio; 35 Eric Becker; -- Ricky Cabrera; 10 Ty Doucette; 15 Justin Lebron; 16 Tyson Lewis; Outfielders: 9 Kyle Henley; 23 Mason Neville; 13 Esmith Pineda; 29 Damian Ruiz; -- Anthony Stephan; 6 Kien Vu	Manager: 4 Julio Morillo; Coaches: 19 Willie Blair (pitching); 32 Troy Gingrich (hitting); 44 Gustavo Molina (coach); 25 Eric Richardson (coach); 7-day injured list; * On Cincinnati Reds 40-man roster; ~ Development list; # Rehab assignment; ∞ Reserve list; ‡ Restricted list; § Suspended list; † Temporarily inactive list; Roster updated November 2, 2026; Transactions; → More rosters: MiLB • Midwest League; → Cincinnati Reds minor league players

=== Single-A ===
Daytona Tortugas roster
Players		Coaches/Other
Pitchers: 28 Dony Aguilera; 38 Jake Brink; 28 Ben Brutti; 29 Jesus Colina; 14 Abraham Gaitan; 41 Justin Henschel; -- Luke Holman; 7 Tyner Horn; 16 Lisnerkin Lantigua; 24 Sheng-En Lin; 16 Duncan Martsen; 8 Ryjeteri Merite; 1 Ethan Norby; 24 Braden Osbolt; 40 Luis Pimentel; 5 Iker Redona; 31 Dusty Revis; 23 Alejandro Rivera; 21 Bryan Salgado; 27 Dominic Scheffler; 45 Tristan Smith; -- Gabe Starks; 33 Logan Tanner; 20 Aaron Watson	Catchers: 35 Ian Francis; 10 Henry Hunter; 28 Dylan King; 13 Jirvin Morillo; Infielders: 3 Anielson Buten; 4 Ichiro Cano; 11 Jalen Hairston; 6 Steele Hall; 17 Sherman Johnson; 48 Mulivai Levu; 34 Yael Romero; 2 Rafhlmil Torres; Outfielders: 37 Drew Davies; 44 Arnaldo Lantigua; 25 Adolfo Sanchez	Manager: 11 Willie Harris; Coaches: 2 Karavin Dew (performance); 30 Lenny Harris (bench); 50 Jason Immekus (pitching); 18 Jose Leon (hitting); 7-day injured list; * On Cincinnati Reds 40-man roster; ~ Development list; # Rehab assignment; ∞ Reserve list; ‡ Restricted list; § Suspended list; † Temporarily inactive list; Roster updated November 2, 2026; Transactions; → More rosters: MiLB • Florida State League; → Cincinnati Reds minor league players

=== Rookie ===
Arizona Complex League Reds roster
Players		Coaches/Other
Pitchers: 45 Jhan Almeida; 62 Johan Cabeza; 43 Moises Castillo; 96 Edwin Cervantes; -- Victor Christal; 54 Reid Clague; 22 Irvin Gonzalez; -- Conner Griffin; 97 Khristian Guevara; -- Tristan Helmick; -- Trevor Kuncl; -- Ray Ladd; 68 Carson Latimer; 76 Christian Lopez; 74 Cesar Maiz; 98 Maison Martinez; -- Ryan Nelson; 51 Owen Pote; -- Calvin Proskey; -- Brody Purcell; 57 Sergio Villa	Catchers: 9 Yanuel Casiano; 30 Brandon Jaime; -- Brady Neal; Infielders: -- Dylan Bowen; 32 Juan Brown; 35 Hansel Jimenez; 37 Naibel Mariano; -- Bernard Moon; 39 Diorland Zambrano; Outfielders: 40 Yojanser Calzado; -- Kenny Ishikawa (two way); -- Jack Lausch; 3 Pablo Nunez; 2 Eli Pitts	Manager: 34 Fred Corral; Coaches: 16 Cesar Garcia (coach); 7-day injured list; * On Cincinnati Reds 40-man roster; ~ Development list; # Rehab assignment; ∞ Reserve list; ‡ Restricted list; § Suspended list; † Temporarily inactive list; Roster updated November 11, 2026; Transactions; → More rosters: MiLB • Arizona Complex League; → Cincinnati Reds minor league players

=== Foreign Rookie ===
Dominican Summer League Reds roster
Players		Coaches/Other
Pitchers: 61 Jose Alcantara; 59 Christopher Asencio; 43 Luis Avila; 56 Daniel Burgos; 21 Luisangel Chirino; 29 Raymond Cruz; 30 Ariel De La Cruz; -- Luis Delgado; 25 Oniel Diaz; 44 Ysaias Escalona; -- Deivi Garcia; 38 Aitol Lopez; 16 Edgar Lugo; 60 Baldwin Moreno; 17 Jose Navarrete; 32 Julio Pinales; -- Many Ramirez; 58 Jose Saldana; 46 Manuel Sanchez	Catchers: 54 Angel Barboza; 28 Emdys Rosillo; 12 Enry Torres; Infielders: 6 Liberts Aponte; 2 Juan Caricipe; 8 Deinis Chourio; 9 Sandor Feliciano; 49 Jealmy Frias; 6 Omar Guadamuz; 47 Carlos Hernandez; 45 Shendrion Martinus; 9 Riangelo Richardson; 4 Angel Salio; Outfielders: 3 Wanderly De La Cruz; 15 Isaac Garcia; 40 Elder Guttierez; 26 Jaset Martinez; 7 Jose Martinez; 34 Diego Munoz; 45 Angel Nunez	Manager: -- Jose Montilla; Coaches: -- Aaron Bond (defensive); -- Luis Terrero (hitting); 7-day injured list; * On Cincinnati Reds 40-man roster; ~ Development list; # Rehab assignment; ∞ Reserve list; ‡ Restricted list; § Suspended list; † Temporarily inactive list; Roster updated November 18, 2026; Transactions; → More rosters: MiLB • Dominican Summer League; → Cincinnati Reds minor league players
