= Jackson Ferris (baseball) =

American baseball player (born 2004)

Los Angeles Dodgers
- Pitcher
- Born: January 15, 2004 (age 22); Winston-Salem, North Carolina, U.S.
- Bats: Left Throws: Left

Jackson Conner Ferris (born January 15, 2004) is an American baseball pitcher in the Los Angeles Dodgers organization.

== Career ==
Ferris grew up in Mount Airy, North Carolina. He initially attended Mount Airy High School before transferring to IMG Academy in Bradenton, Florida, after his sophomore year. As a junior, Ferris went 8–0 with a 0.55 ERA and 86 strikeouts in 50 2/3 innings pitched. With IMG, he was a teammate of fellow top 2022 draft prospect Elijah Green. Ferris pitched for the United States national under-18 team during the summer prior to his senior season. He signed to play at Ole Miss in November 2021 during the early signing period. He had initially committed to play at NC State, but switched his commitment at the beginning of his junior year. He was named a preseason All-American by Baseball America entering his senior season in 2022.

The Chicago Cubs selected Ferris in the second round with the 47th overall pick in the 2022 Major League Baseball draft, and he signed on July 30, 2022, for an over-slot signing bonus of $3,005,000. He began his professional career in 2023 with the Class-A Myrtle Beach Pelicans, where he had a 3.38 ERA in 18 starts.

On January 11, 2024, Chicago traded Ferris and Zyhir Hope to the Los Angeles Dodgers for Michael Busch and Yency Almonte. Ferris participated in the inaugural Spring Breakout minor league showcase game during spring training 2024. He was assigned to the High-A Great Lakes Loons to begin the 2024 season and was the team's opening day starter. In 20 starts for the Loons, he was 4–4 with a 3.39 ERA and 119 strikeouts. Ferris was promoted to the Double-A Tulsa Drillers on August 3 and he made seven starts for them down the stretch, with a 1–3 record, 2.54 ERA and 26 strikeouts. Ferris was selected as the Dodgers Branch Rickey Minor League Pitcher of the Year for 2024.

Ferris returned to Tulsa for the 2025 season, where he was named the team's opening day starter. In 26 appearances (24 starts) on the year, he was 10–7 with a 3.86 ERA and 135 strikeouts. He was promoted to the Triple-A Oklahoma City Comets on April 7, 2026. In the 2026 season, he was 4–5 with a 5.12 ERA in 24 games (22 starts) while striking out 119.

On November 17, 2026, the Dodgers purchased his contract and added him to the 40-man roster.
