= Chattanooga Lookouts =

- Founded in 1885; Chattanooga, Tennessee
Team logo
Cap insignia

Minor league affiliations
- Class: Double-A (1946–1961, 1963–1965, 1976–present)
- Previous classes: Class A1 (1936–1945); Class A (1910–1935); Class C (1909); Class A (1902); Class B (1886, 1892–1893, 1895, 1901)
- League: Southern League (1976–present)
- Division: North Division
- Previous leagues: Southern League (1964–1965); South Atlantic League (1963); Southern Association (1910–1961); South Atlantic League (1909); Southern Association (1901–1902); Southeastern League (1897); Southern League (1885–1886, 1889, 1892–1893, 1895)

Major league affiliations
- Team: Cincinnati Reds (2019–present)
- Previous teams: Minnesota Twins (2015–2018); Los Angeles Dodgers (2009–2014); Cincinnati Reds (1988–2008); Seattle Mariners (1983–1987); Cleveland Indians (1978–1982); Oakland Athletics (1976–1977); Philadelphia Phillies (1960–1961, 1963–1965); Washington Senators (1932–1937, 1941–1959)

Minor league titles
- Dixie Series titles (1): 1932
- League titles (4): 1909; 1988; 2015; 2017
- Pennants (4): 1932; 1939; 1952; 1961
- Division titles (7): 1988; 1992; 1995; 1996; 2014; 2015; 2017
- First-half titles (10): 1909; 1976; 1988; 1992; 2006; 2011; 2015; 2017; 2023; 2025
- Second-half titles (8): 1992; 1994; 1995; 1996; 2004; 2012; 2014; 2017

Team data
- Name: Chattanooga Lookouts (1976–present)
- Previous names: Chattanooga Lookouts (1901–1902, 1909–1961, 1963–1965); Chattanooga Blues (1897); Chattanooga Warriors (1893, 1895); Chattanooga Chatts (1892); Chattanooga (1889); Chattanooga Lookouts (1885–1886)
- Colors: Red, black, white
- Mascot: Looie the Lookout
- Ballpark: Erlanger Park (2026–present)
- Previous parks: AT&T Field (2000–2025); Engel Stadium (1930–1961, 1963–1965, 1976–1999); Andrews Field (1910–1929); Chamberlain Field (1909); Stanton Field (1892–1893, 1895, 1901–1902); Base Ball Grounds (1885–1886, 1889)
- Owner/ Operator: Hardball Capital
- President: Rich Mozingo
- Manager: Jose Moreno
- Website: mlb.com/milb/chattanooga

The Chattanooga Lookouts are a Minor League Baseball team of the Southern League and the Double-A affiliate of the Cincinnati Reds. They are located in Chattanooga, Tennessee, and are named for Lookout Mountain. The team plays their home games at Erlanger Park, which opened in 2026.

The franchise traces it lineage back to 1885 with the Chattanooga Lookouts who were charter members on the original Southern League until folding in 1886. Other teams followed in various leagues, including the Chatts, Warriors, and Blues, but Lookouts has been the predominate nickname for teams from the city. In 1901, a new Lookouts club was formed as a charter member of the Southern Association that, despite a few years of inactivity, playing in other circuits, and relocating during the 1943 season, continued in the league through 1961. After a year of dormancy, the Lookouts returned to play in the original South Atlantic League in 1963 and in the modern Southern League from 1964 to 1965. After a 10-year stretch with no professional baseball in the city, the current iteration of the Lookouts joined the Southern League in 1976.

The Lookouts' played their home games at the Chattanooga's Base Ball grounds between 1885 to 1902. They played a season at Chamberlain Field in 1909, but moved to Andrews Field from 1910 to 1929. Chattanooga played at Engel Stadium for 70 seasons from 1930 to 1999 until moving into AT&T Field from 2000 to 2025. They have played at Erlanger Park since 2026.

Chattanooga has won the Southern League championship three times: first in 1988 as the Double-A affiliate of the Cincinnati Reds and again in 2015 and 2017 as affiliates of the Minnesota Twins. In the Southern Association, the Lookouts won four league pennants (1932, 1939, 1952, and 1961) and the Dixie Series in 1932. They also won the South Atlantic League playoff championship in 1909.

== History ==
=== Early teams (1885–1925) ===
The Chattanooga Lookouts trace their lineage back to 1885 with the formation of the first iteration of the Lookouts, who were charter members of the original Southern League from 1885 to 1886 and played their home games at the local Base Ball Grounds. On July 10, 1886, Chattanooga, last in the standings, voluntarily dropped out of the league to provide the circuit with an even number of teams days after the Augusta Browns folded.

Other Minor League Baseball teams represented Chattanooga, Tennessee, after this initial entry into professional baseball, including several more clubs in the Southern League over the next decade. After fielding an unnamed team in 1889, the Chattanooga Chatts represented the city in 1892 and played their home games at Stanton Field. The Southern League entries in 1893 and 1895 were called the Chattanooga Warriors. They transferred to Mobile, Alabama, as the Mobile Bluebirds, on July 19, 1895. The Chattanooga Blues competed in the Southeastern League in 1897. A second iteration of the Lookouts played from 1901 to 1902 as members of the new Southern Association.

After the 1908 season, Oliver Burnside "O.B." Andrews, owner of the Andrews Paper Box Company, Garnett Carter, and a third unidentified party took ownership of a franchise in the original South Atlantic League and moved the team to Chattanooga, adopting the name Lookouts after a fan contest. They played their home games at Chamberlain Field. The 1909 Lookouts won the first half of the league's split-season, then defeated the Augusta Tourists, 4–2, in the playoffs to win the city's first professional baseball championship. In 1910, Andrews purchased the Little Rock Travelers Southern Association franchise and placed it in Chattanooga, replacing the SALLY League club. They played at Andrews Field in the 1100 block of East 3rd Street, which remained the site of their home ballpark for nearly a century.

=== The Joe Engel era (1926–1965) ===
Washington Senators owner Clark Griffith sent former pitcher and baseball scout Joe Engel to Chattanooga to buy the Lookouts in 1926 and build a new ballpark. He opened Engel Stadium in 1930 on the site of Andrews Field. The first game at the new stadium was played April 15, 1930, in which the Lookouts beat the Atlanta Crackers, 6–5, before some 16,000 people. In 1931, the New York Yankees played an exhibition game against the Lookouts. During the game, a 17-year-old girl named Jackie Mitchell pitched for the Lookouts and struck out Lou Gehrig and Babe Ruth.

The Lookouts began their first Major League Baseball affiliation in 1932, becoming the Class A affiliate of the Washington Senators. The Lookouts ended that season tied with the Memphis Chicks for first place, but the pennant was awarded to Chattanooga by commissioner Kenesaw Mountain Landis. They then won the Dixie Series, a postseason interleague championship between the champions of the Southern Association and the Texas League, defeating the Beaumont Exporters, 4–1, in the best-of-seven series. Chattanooga continued its affiliation with Washington through 1937, though the league was reclassified as a Class A1 circuit in 1936. The 1939 club won a second Southern Association pennant, but they were swept in the first round of the playoffs by Atlanta, 3–0.

In 1941, the Lookouts returned to the Senators organization at Class A1, which was later renamed Double-A in 1946. During the 1943 season, Griffith relocated the Lookouts to Montgomery, Alabama, as the Montgomery Rebels, where they played at the Cramton Bowl due to a decline in attendance. However, they returned to Chattanooga in December of that year after Engel organized a letter-writing campaign aimed at Griffith. The 1952 club won a third Southern Association pennant but was eliminated by Memphis in the first round of the playoffs, 4–0. Their affiliation with Washington ended after the 1959 season.

The Lookouts became the Double-A affiliate of the Philadelphia Phillies in 1960. They won the Southern Association's final pennant in 1961, but championship playoffs were not held. Following the campaign, the Southern Association disbanding due to the loss of some of its teams and the inability of others to secure major league working agreements for 1962.

After a season of dormancy, Chattanooga returned to professional baseball in 1963 as the Double-A affiliate of the Phillies playing in the South Atlantic League. The SALLY League dissolved after the season and rebranded itself as the Southern League in 1964. The Lookouts continued as the Double-A Phillies in the new league through 1965. After the season, which drew fewer than 26,000 people to Engel Stadium, including fewer than 400 to their final game, the Lookouts folded.

=== Current franchise (1976–present) ===
Following the 1975 season, businessman Woody Reid, his son, Mark, optician Jim Crittenden, and attorney Arvin Reingold purchased the Southern League's Birmingham Barons from Charlie Finley, owner of the Oakland Athletics, and relocated the team to Chattanooga as the current incarnation of the Lookouts. They became the Athletics' Double-A affiliate. Chattanooga won the First-Half Western Division title but lost a single playoff game to the Montgomery Rebels to determine the Western Division champion.

Chattanooga served the Double-A farm team of the Cleveland Indians from 1978 to 1982. Over the five-year affiliation, the team regularly finished at or near the bottom of the league standings and did not qualify for the playoffs. Their only season with a record over .500 occurred in 1979.

They joined the Seattle Mariners organization as their Double-A club from 1983 to 1987. They incurred losing records in all five seasons without qualifying for the postseason.

The Lookouts began a 21-year affiliation with the Cincinnati Reds in 1988. The partnership began with Chattanooga winning the First-Half Western Division title and defeating the Memphis Chicks, 3–1, in the best-of-five Western Division series. The Lookouts then swept the Greenville Braves, 4–0, to win their first Southern League championship. Though they qualified for the playoffs on six subsequent occasions, they did not win another league championship during this affiliation. Chattanooga, winners of both halves of the 1992 season, reached the finals, but lost the league title to Greenville, 3–2. They were defeated in the 1995 championship round by the Carolina Mudcats, 3–2, in another series that went the full five games. The Lookouts lost the 1996 Southern League title to the Jacksonville Suns, 3–1.

In 1995, the team was purchased by a local group led by Frank Burke, who sought to finance and build a new ballpark to replace the aging Engle Stadium. The Lookouts played their final game at the long-time facility on September 12, 1999. BellSouth Park, later AT&T Field opened in 2000.

Chattanooga became the Double-A affiliate of the Los Angeles Dodgers in 2009. They made back-to-back playoff appearances in 2011 and 2012 but were eliminated in the first round each time. The 2014 Lookouts reached the finals but were swept by Jacksonville, 3–0.

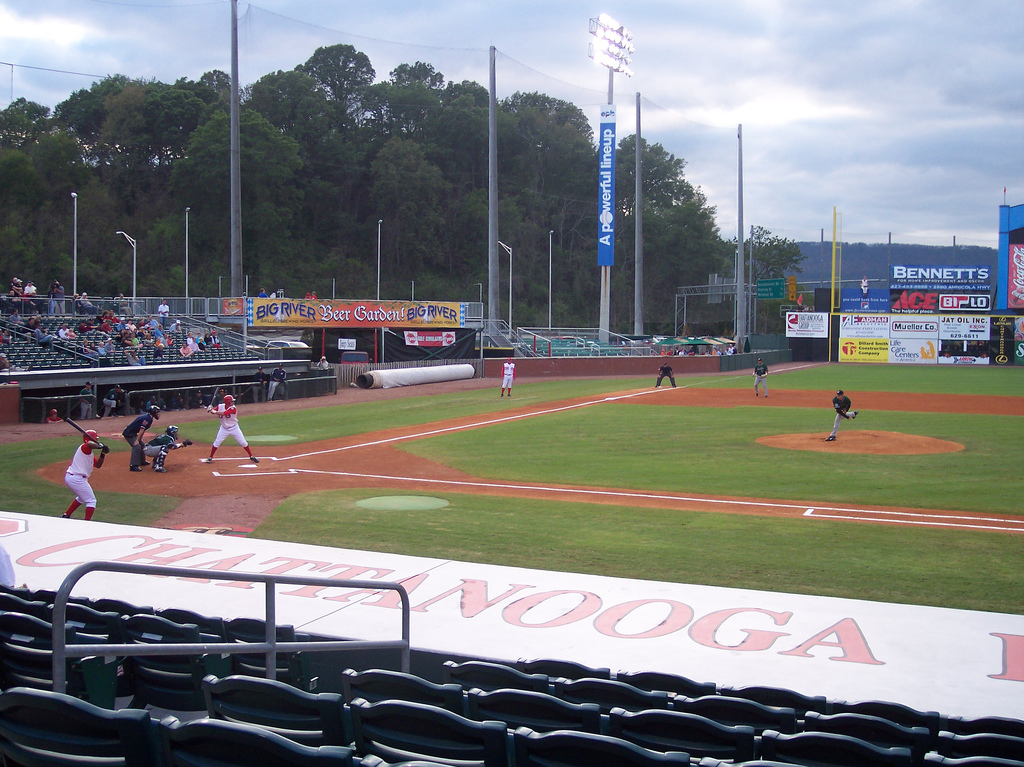
A Chattanooga Lookouts game at AT&T Field in 2007

In 2015, Frank Burke sold the team to Hardball Capital, led by Jason Freier and John Woods. The Lookouts also affiliated with the Minnesota Twins, who were the former Washington Senators—Chattanooga's parent club from 1932 to 1937 and 1941 to 1959. The affiliation started with the team clinching the first-half title. After beating the Montgomery Biscuits, 3–1, for the Northern Division title, they won their second Southern League championship over the Biloxi Shuckers, 3–2. Returning to the playoffs in 2017 after winning both halves of the season, Chattanooga defeated Montgomery in the division series to advance to the finals. However, the championship series was canceled due to the threat of Hurricane Irma, and the Lookouts and the Pensacola Blue Wahoos were declared co-champions.

The Lookouts returned to the Cincinnati Reds organization in 2019 as their Double-A affiliate. The start of the 2020 season was initially postponed due to the COVID-19 pandemic before being cancelled altogether. Following the 2020 season, Major League Baseball assumed control of Minor League Baseball in a move to increase player salaries, modernize facility standards, and reduce travel. Along with the restructuring of the minors, the Southern League disbanded, and the Lookouts were placed in the Double-A South, where they continued as affiliates of the Reds. In 2022, this league returned to being known as the Southern League, the name historically used by the regional circuit prior to reorganization. Chattanooga qualified for the postseason in 2023 and 2025 but was eliminated in the first round each time.

On July 15, 2024, the team and local officials broke ground on the $115-million Erlanger Park in the South Broad Street area. The stadium is located on the site of the former U.S. Pipe/Wheland Foundry and flanked by I-24 as it runs along Nickajack Lake. The Lookouts left AT&T Field after the 2025 season and moved into the new facility in 2026.

== Season-by-season records ==
Key
League	The team's final position in the league standings
Division	The team's final position in the divisional standings
GB	Games behind the team that finished in first place in the division that season
Apps.	Postseason appearances: number of seasons the team qualified for the postseason
†	League champions (1977–present)
*	Division champions (1977–present)
^	Postseason berth (1977–present)

Season-by-season records
Season	League	Regular-season					Postseason			MLB affiliate	Ref.
Season	League	Record	Win %	League	Division	GB	Record	Win %	Result	MLB affiliate	Ref.
1977	SL	61–75	.449	6th	2nd	24 1/2	—	—	Result	—	Oakland Athletics
1978	SL	63–80	.441	10th	5th	24 1/2	—	—	—	Cleveland Indians	
1979	SL	75–69	.521	4th	3rd	8	—	—	—	Cleveland Indians	
1980	SL	61–83	.424	9th	4th	36 1/2	—	—	—	Cleveland Indians	
1981	SL	67–75	.472	7th	4th	13 1/2	—	—	—	Cleveland Indians	
1982	SL	63–80	.441	10th	5th	13 1/2	—	—	—	Cleveland Indians	
1983	SL	68–75	.476	5th	3rd	22	—	—	—	Seattle Mariners	
1984	SL	63–81	.438	10th	5th	9 1/2	—	—	—	Seattle Mariners	
1985	SL	66–77	.462	8th	3rd	13	—	—	—	Seattle Mariners	
1986	SL	68–78	.451	10th	5th	14 1/2	—	—	—	Seattle Mariners	
1987	SL	68–75	.476	6th (tie)	4th	5 1/2	—	—	—	Seattle Mariners	
1988^ * †	SL	81–62	.566	2nd	1st	—	6–1	.857	Won First-Half Western Division title Won Western Division title vs. Memphis Chicks, 3–1; Won SL championship vs. Greenville Braves, 3–0	Cincinnati Reds	
1989	SL	58–81	.417	9th	4th	28	—	—	—	Cincinnati Reds	
1990	SL	68–78	.458	8th	5th	13	—	—	—	Cincinnati Reds	
1991	SL	73–71	.507	6th	2nd	4 1/2	—	—	—	Cincinnati Reds	
1992^ *	SL	90–53	.629	2nd	1st	—	5–4	.556	Won First and Second-Half Western Division titles Won Western Division title vs. Huntsville Stars, 3–1; Lost SL championship vs. Greenville Braves, 3–2	Cincinnati Reds	
1993	SL	72–69	.511	4th	2nd	5 1/2	—	—	—	Cincinnati Reds	
1994^	SL	67–73	.479	6th	4th	15	0–3	.000	Won Second-Half Western Division title Lost Western Division title vs. Huntsville Stars, 3–0	Cincinnati Reds	
1995^ *	SL	83–60	.580	2nd	1st	—	5–5	.500	Won Second-Half Western Division title Won Western Division title vs. Memphis Chicks, 3–2; Lost SL championship vs. Carolina Mudcats, 3–2	Cincinnati Reds	
1996^ *	SL	81–59	.579	2nd	2nd	1/2	4–4	.500	Won Second-Half Western Division title Won Western Division title vs. Memphis Chicks, 3–1; Lost SL championship vs. Jacksonville Suns, 3–1	Cincinnati Reds	
1997	SL	70–69	.504	5th (tie)	3rd (tie)	7	—	—	—	Cincinnati Reds	
1998	SL	65–73	.471	7th (tie)	3rd (tie)	20	—	—	—	Cincinnati Reds	
1999^	SL	78–62	.557	2nd	2nd	5 1/2	1–3	.250	Lost Western Division title vs. West Tenn Diamond Jaxx, 3–1	Cincinnati Reds	
2000	SL	70–68	.507	3rd (tie)	3rd	10	—	—	—	Cincinnati Reds	
2001^	SL	72–67	.518	5th	2nd	11	2–3	.400	Lost Eastern Division title vs. Jacksonville Suns, 3–2	Cincinnati Reds	
2002	SL	60–80	.429	9th	5th	19	—	—	—	Cincinnati Reds	
2003	SL	66–74	.471	8th (tie)	3rd (tie)	10	—	—	—	Cincinnati Reds	
2004^	SL	87–53	.621	1st	1st	—	1–3	.250	Won Second-Half Eastern Division title Lost Eastern Division title vs. Tennessee Smokies, 3–1	Cincinnati Reds	
2005	SL	53–83	.390	10th	5th	28 1/2	—	—	—	Cincinnati Reds	
2006^	SL	81–59	.579	2nd	1st	—	0–3	.000	Won First-Half Northern Division title Lost Northern Division title vs. Huntsville Stars, 3–0	Cincinnati Reds	
2007	SL	67–73	.479	7th	3rd	9 1/2	—	—	—	Cincinnati Reds	
2008	SL	67–72	.482	8th	4th	12 1/2	—	—	—	Cincinnati Reds	
2009	SL	65–74	.468	6th (tie)	2nd (tie)	5 1/2	—	—	—	Los Angeles Dodgers	
2010	SL	65–74	.468	7th	4th	21	—	—	—	Los Angeles Dodgers	
2011^	SL	77–62	.554	3rd	2nd	5 1/2	0–3	.000	Won First-Half Northern Division title Lost Northern Division title vs. Tennessee Smokies, 3–0	Los Angeles Dodgers	
2012^	SL	73–65	.529	3rd	2nd	5	1–3	.250	Won Second-Half Northern Division title Lost Northern Division title vs. Jackson Generals, 3–1	Los Angeles Dodgers	
2013	SL	59–80	.424	10th	5th	17 1/2	—	—	—	Los Angeles Dodgers	
2014^ *	SL	61–77	.442	8th	4th	15	3–5	.375	Won Second-Half Northern Division title Won Northern Division title vs. Huntsville Stars, 3–2; Lost SL championship vs. Jacksonville Suns, 3–0	Los Angeles Dodgers	
2015^ * †	SL	76–61	.555	3rd	2nd	1/2	6–3	.667	Won First-Half Northern Division title Won Northern Division title vs. Montgomery Biscuits, 3–1; Won SL championship vs. Biloxi Shuckers, 3–2	Minnesota Twins	
2016	SL	76–65	.536	4th	3rd	9 1/2	—	—	—	Minnesota Twins	
2017^ * †	SL	91–49	.650	1st	1st	—	3–2	.600	Won First and Second-Half Northern Division titles Won Northern Division title vs. Montgomery Biscuits, 3–2; Declared SL co-champions with Pensacola Blue Wahoos	Minnesota Twins	
2018	SL	65–72	.474	9th	5th	12 1/2	—	—	—	Minnesota Twins	
2019	SL	61–75	.449	8th	4th	26	—	—	—	Cincinnati Reds	
2020	SL	Season cancelled (COVID-19 pandemic)								Cincinnati Reds	
2021	AAS	58–54	.518	4th	2nd	1	—	—	—	Cincinnati Reds	
2022	SL	61–75	.449	7th	3rd	19	—	—	—	Cincinnati Reds	
2023^	SL	70–67	.511	5th	2nd	5	0–2	.000	Won First-Half Northern Division title Lost Northern Division title vs. Tennessee Smokies, 2–0	Cincinnati Reds	
2024	SL	45–90	.311	10th	5th	41	—	—	—	Cincinnati Reds	
2025^	SL	73–61	.545	3rd	2nd	6	1–2	.333	Won First-Half Northern Division title Lost Northern Division title vs. Birmingham Barons, 2–1	Cincinnati Reds	
Totals	—	3,308–3,388	.494	—	—	—	38–49	.437	—	—	—

== Radio and television ==
All Lookouts home and road games are broadcast on 98.1 FM The Lake since 2019. Live audio broadcasts are also available online through the team's website and the Minor League Baseball mobile app. Games can be viewed through the MLB.TV streaming service, with audio provided by a radio simulcast. Larry Ward has been the lead broadcaster since 1989.

== Mascot ==
The Chattanooga Lookouts' mascot is Looie the Lookout. He is an anthropomorphized version of the team's logo.

== Roster ==
Chattanooga Lookouts roster
Players	Coaches/Other
Pitchers: 29 Cody Adcock; 35 Beau Blanchard; 31 Will Cannon; 18 Thomas Farr; 24 Taylor Floyd; 38 Ryan Garcia; 38 Johnathan Harmon; 20 Luke Hayden; 1 Bryce Hubbart; 9 Anyer Laureano; 34 Johnathan Lavallee; 22 Nate Peterson; 8 Stephen Quigley; 13 Javi Rivera; Catchers: 32 Pablo Aliendo; 44 Alfredo Duno; 45 Cade Hunter; Infielders: 23 Julio Carreras; 6 Cam Collier; 2 Trey Faltine; 12 Carter Graham; 54 Ruben Ibarra; 19 Steffon Moore; 2 Carlos Sanchez; 10 Peyton Stovall; Outfielders: 27 Yerlin Confidan; 11 Austin Hendrick	Manager: 24 Jose Moreno; Coaches: 25 Joel Bonnett (pitching); 17 Mike Jacobs (hitting); 33 Caleb Longley (assistant hitting); 21 Reggie Williams (coach); 60-day injured list: -- Connor Burns; 16 Nestor Lorant; 15 Nick Sando (full season); 3 Shane Sasaki; 7-day injured list; * On Cincinnati Reds 40-man roster; ~ Development list; # Rehab assignment; ∞ Reserve list; ‡ Restricted list; § Suspended list; † Temporarily inactive list; Roster updated September 16, 2026; Transactions; → More rosters: MiLB • Southern League; → Cincinnati Reds minor league players

== Achievements ==
=== Awards ===
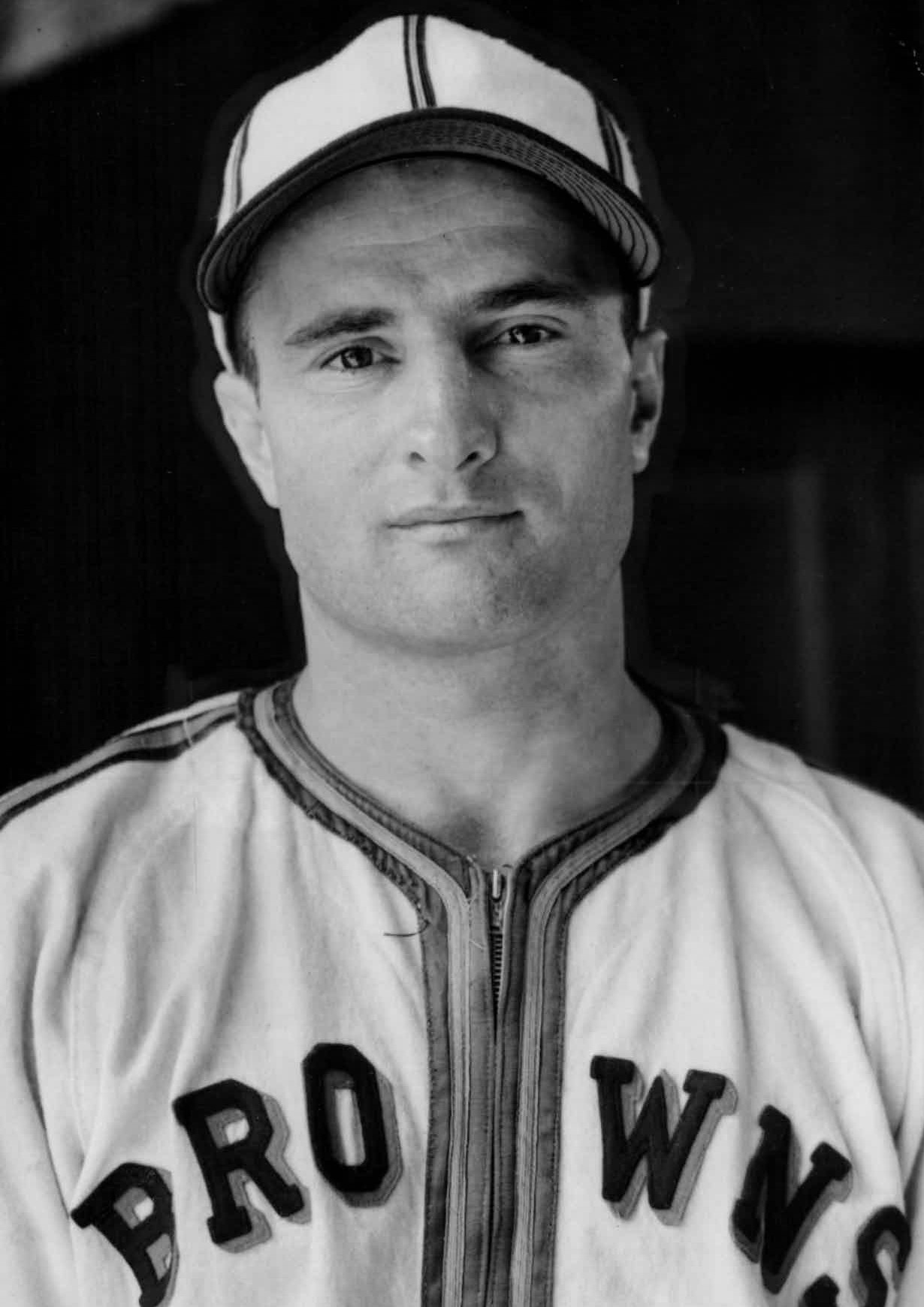
Ellis Clary won the 1952 Southern Association Most Valuable Player Award.

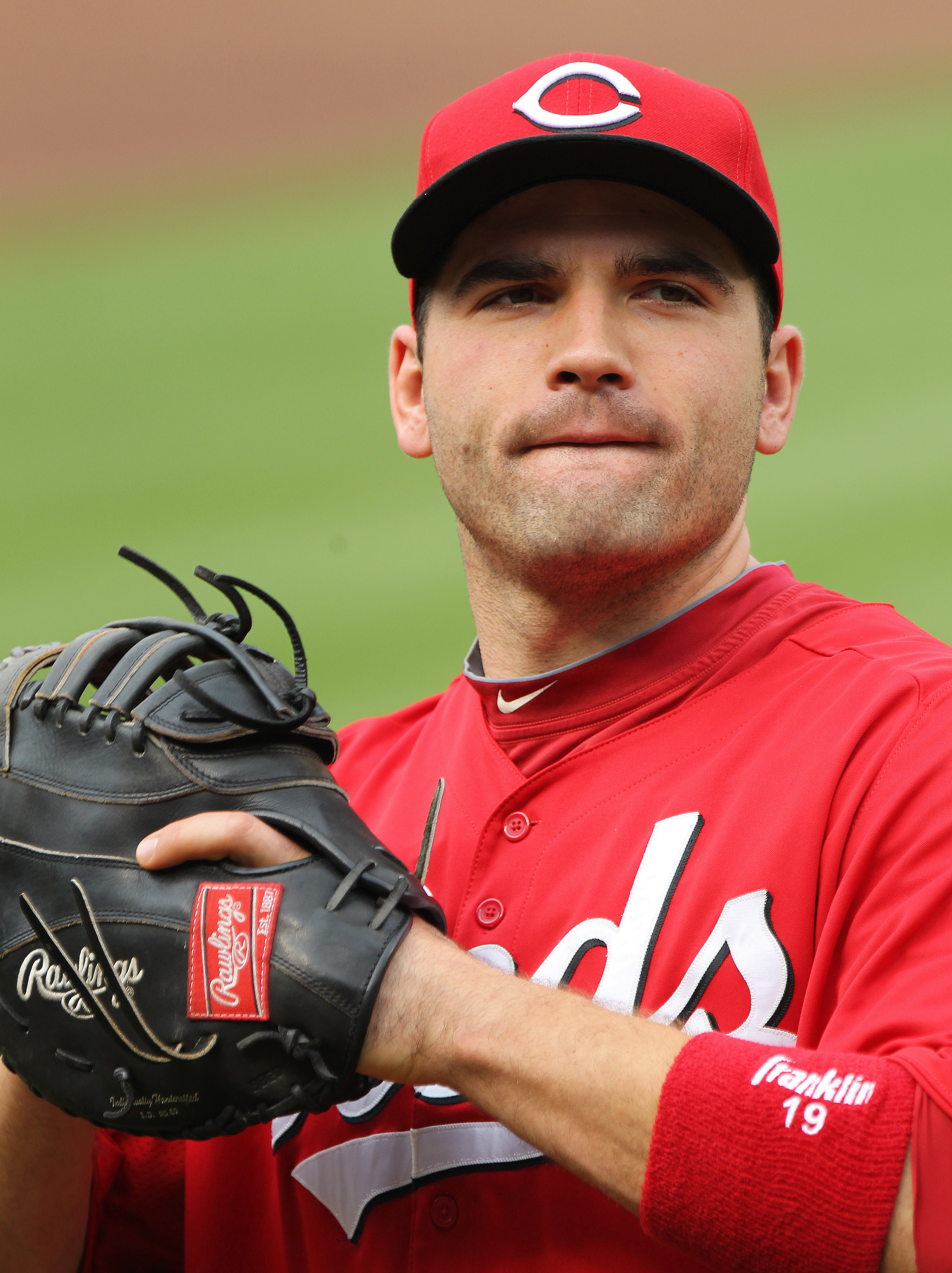
Joey Votto won the 1996 Southern League Most Valuable Player Award.

One player won a Southern Association award in recognition for their performance with the Lookouts.

Southern Association awards
Award	Recipient	Season	Ref.
Most Valuable Player	Ellis Clary	1952	

Six players, four managers, and five executives have won Southern League awards in recognition for their performance with the Lookouts.

Southern League awards
Award	Recipient	Season	Ref.
Most Valuable Player	Brady Clark	1999	
Most Valuable Player	Joey Votto	2006	
Most Valuable Player	Max Kepler	2015	
Most Valuable Player	Sal Stewart	2025	
Most Outstanding Pitcher	Jerry Spradlin	1992	
Most Outstanding Pitcher	Curt Lyons	1996	
Top MLB Prospect	Sal Stewart	2025	
Manager of the Year	Rene Lachemann	1976	
Manager of the Year	Mark Berry	1996	
Manager of the Year	Jayhawk Owens	2004	
Manager of the Year	Jake Mauer	2017	
Executive of the Year	Bill Lee	1989	
Executive of the Year	Bill Davidson	1992	
Executive of the Year	Frank Burke (1)	2001	
Executive of the Year	Frank Burke (2)	2011	
Executive of the Year	Rich Mozingo	2019	
Woman of Excellence	Morgan Billups	2014	

These teams have won Minor League Baseball year-end awards.

Minor League Baseball awards
Award	Recipient	Season	Ref.
Larry MacPhail Award	Chattanooga Lookouts	2009	

=== Retired numbers ===
The Lookouts have honored one player by retiring his uniform number. This ensures that the number will be associated with one player of particular importance to the team. An additional number, 42, was retired throughout professional baseball in 1997 to honor Jackie Robinson, the first African American to play in Major League Baseball in the modern era. The number 26 was retired in 2003 in honor of Dernell Stenson, an outfielder, who was murdered that autumn while playing in the Arizona Fall League.
