= Elijah Green =

Elijah Green may refer to:

- Pumpsie Green (1933–2019), American baseball infielder, full name Elijah Jerry Green
- Elijah Green (baseball) (born 2003), American baseball player
