= Lou Collier =

American baseball player (born 1973)

- Utility player
- Born: August 21, 1973 (age 52); Chicago, Illinois, U.S.
- Batted: Right Threw: Right

Professional debut
- MLB: June 28, 1997, for the Pittsburgh Pirates
- KBO: 2005, for the LG Twins

Last appearance
- MLB: September 30, 2004, for the Philadelphia Phillies
- KBO: 2006, for the Hanwha Eagles

MLB statistics
- Batting average: .241
- Home runs: 8
- Runs batted in: 78

KBO statistics
- Batting average: .290
- Home runs: 22
- Runs batted in: 86
- Stats at Baseball Reference

Teams
- Pittsburgh Pirates (1997–1998); Milwaukee Brewers (1999–2001); Montreal Expos (2002); Boston Red Sox (2003); Philadelphia Phillies (2004); LG Twins (2005); Hanwha Eagles (2006)

Louis Keith Collier (born August 21, 1973) is an American former professional baseball utility player. He played in Major League Baseball (MLB) for the Pittsburgh Pirates, Milwaukee Brewers, Montreal Expos, Boston Red Sox, and Philadelphia Phillies. He also played in the KBO League for the LG Twins and Hanwha Eagles. He was selected by the Pirates in the 31st round of the 1992 Major League Baseball draft. He also served as first base coach for the 2023 United States national baseball team.

== Professional career ==
In 1994, Collier was selected as the most valuable player of the South Atlantic League's all-star game after leading the National League affiliate teams to a 9–5 victory with three hits, including a home run. He reached the Majors in 1997 with the Pittsburgh Pirates, spending two years with them before moving to the Milwaukee Brewers (1999-2001), Montreal Expos (2002), Boston Red Sox (2003) and Philadelphia Phillies (2004). In 1998 with Pittsburgh, he posted career-highs in games played (110), hits (82), runs (30), RBI (34), doubles (13) and triples (6).

In 315 major league games, Collier was a .241 hitter with eight home runs and 78 RBI. In 2007, he was invited by the Philadelphia Phillies to spring training after spending two seasons with the LG Twins and Hanwha Eagles in Korea Baseball Organization.

On June 1, 2007, as a member of the Ottawa Lynx, Collier announced his retirement from professional baseball. In 2016, he was listed as a Chicago-based scout for the Kansas City Royals.

== Personal life ==
Collier's son, Cam, was drafted 18th overall by the Cincinnati Reds in the 2022 Major League Baseball draft.
