= Jud Fabian =

American baseball player (born 2000)

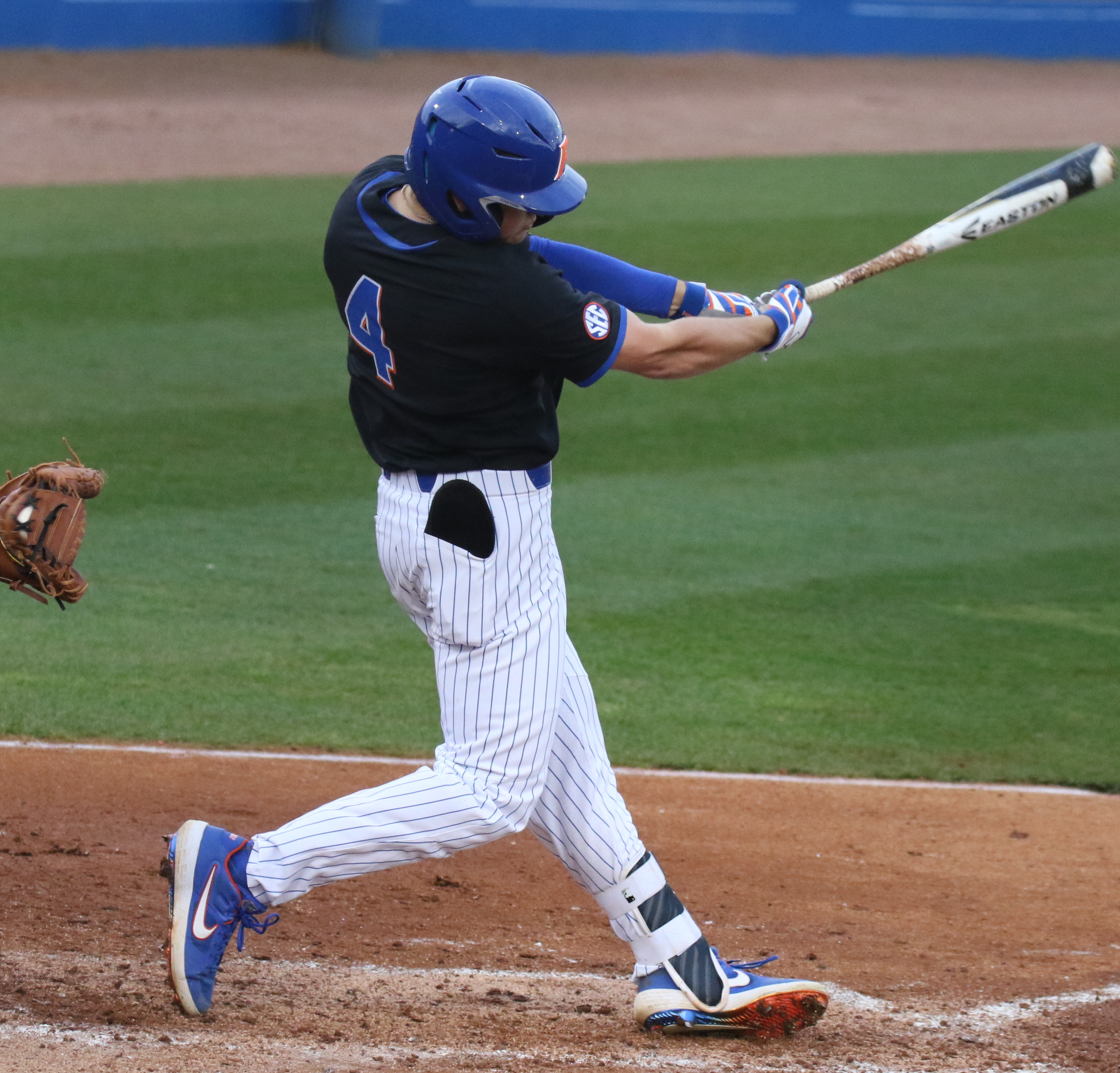
- Fabian with the Florida Gators in 2019

Baltimore Orioles
- Outfielder
- Born: September 27, 2000 (age 25); Ocala, Florida, U.S.
- Bats: Right Throws: Left

Judson Edward Fabian (born September 27, 2000) is an American professional baseball outfielder in the Baltimore Orioles organization.

== Amateur career ==
Fabian attended Trinity Catholic High School in Ocala, Florida, where he played baseball. In 2018, his junior year, he batted .453 with 11 home runs. He played in the Under Armour All-America Baseball Game at Wrigley Field that summer. He graduated from high school early, and enrolled at the University of Florida to play college baseball in January 2019.

In 2019, Fabian's freshman year at Florida, he played in 56 games (making 54 starts) in which he batted .232 with seven home runs, 26 RBI, and seven stolen bases. That summer, he played in the Cape Cod Baseball League with the Bourne Braves, and was the youngest ever selection to Cape Cod League All-Star Team. As a sophomore in 2020, Fabian batted .294 with five home runs and 13 RBI over 17 games before the season was cut short due to the COVID-19 pandemic. He played in the Florida Collegiate Summer League that summer, batting .304 with two home runs and 11 RBI alongside a .971 fielding percentage over 19 games.

In 2021, as a redshirt sophomore (given a redshirt due to the cancellation of the 2020 season), Fabian began the season struggling with high strikeout rates. Throughout the course of the year, he decreased his strikeout numbers (going from a 37.4% strikeout rate in April to 29% at the end of the season) and also began hitting for power, and was named to the All-Southeastern Conference First Team. He finished the season batting .249 with twenty home runs and 46 RBI over 59 starts in center field. He became the fifth player in Gator baseball history to reach twenty home runs in a single season. After the season, Fabian was selected by the Boston Red Sox in the second round with the 40th overall selection of the 2021 Major League Baseball draft. On August 1, after failing to agree with the club on a signing bonus, Fabian announced that he would return to Florida for his redshirt junior season. For the 2022 season, Fabian appeared in 66 games and slashed .239/.414/.598 with 24 home runs and 55 RBI, striking out 22.2% of the time while walking 20%.

== Professional career ==
The Baltimore Orioles drafted Fabian in the second round, with the 67th overall selection, in the 2022 Major League Baseball draft. He signed with the team for $1 million.

Fabian made his professional debut with the Rookie-level Florida Complex League Orioles and was later promoted to the Delmarva Shorebirds of the Single-A Carolina League. In late August, he earned another promoted to the Aberdeen Ironbirds of the High-A South Atlantic League. Over 22 games between both affiliates, he batted .333 with three home runs, 16 RBI, and nine doubles. To open the 2023 season, Fabian was assigned back to Aberdeen. In mid-June, he was promoted to the Bowie Baysox of the Double-A Eastern League. Over 120 games and 430 at-bats for the 2023 season, Fabian slashed .223/.349/.440 with 24 home runs, 74 RBI, 169 strikeouts, and 31 stolen bases.

Fabian was assigned to Bowie to open the 2024 season. He made 128 total appearances split between the Baysox and the Triple-A Norfolk Tides, slashing .215/.305/.390 with 20 home runs, 65 RBI, and 16 stolen bases. In 2025, Fabian played 109 games with Norfolk and hit .183 with 15 home runs and 39 RBI. He returned to Norfolk for the 2026 season and batted .191 with 14 home runs and 50 RBIs across 116 games.
