= Jared McKenzie =

American baseball player (born 2001)

Free agent
- Outfielder
- Born: May 16, 2001 (age 25); Tallahassee, Florida, U.S.
- Bats: Left Throws: Left

Jared Nathan McKenzie (born May 16, 2001) is an American professional baseball outfielder who is currently a free agent.

== Amateur career ==
McKenzie attended Round Rock High School in Round Rock, Texas, where he batted .535 with seven home runs alongside holding a 28-game hitting streak as a senior in 2019. Unselected in the 2019 Major League Baseball draft, he enrolled at Baylor University to play college baseball.

McKenzie started 16 games in center field as a freshman in 2020 and hit .406 with 28 hits before the season was cancelled due to the COVID-19 pandemic. That summer, he played in the Texas Collegiate League for the Round Rock Hairy Men. For the 2021 season, he started 51 games in center field and batted .383 with ten home runs, 44 RBIs, and 14 doubles. He earned All-Big 12 Conference Honors. Following the season's end, he played in the Cape Cod Baseball League with the Orleans Firebirds where he hit .226 with 36 strikeouts over thirty games. Prior to the 2022 season, McKenzie was named an All American by numerous outlets and was also unanimously named to the Preseason All-Big 12 Team. Over 54 games for the season, he batted .288 with 11 home runs and 42 RBIs. After the season, he entered the transfer portal.

== Professional career ==
McKenzie was drafted by the Washington Nationals in the fifth round with the 141st overall selection of the 2022 Major League Baseball draft. He signed with the team for $410,500.

McKenzie made his professional debut with the Fredericksburg Nationals, hitting a home run in his first game with the team. Over seventy at-bats in 17 games, he hit .400 with two home runs, 15 RBIs, seven doubles, and 11 stolen bases. McKenzie played the 2023 season with the Wilmington Blue Rocks with whom he batted .212 with six home runs and 35 RBIs over 105 games. In 2024, he played with Fredericksburg, Wilmington, and the Florida Complex League Nationals and hit .252 with six home runs and 39 RBIs across 91 games. He began the 2025 season with Wilmington, and, on April 30, was promoted to the Harrisburg Senator. He remained with Harrisburg until June 26, 2025, when he was reassigned back to Wilmington. Across 82 games played for the season, he hit .189 with five home runs and 19 RBIs. On March 20, 2026, McKenzie was released by the Nationals.
