= Logan Tanner =

American baseball player (born 2000)

Cincinnati Reds
- Pitcher
- Born: November 10, 2000 (age 25); Hattiesburg, Mississippi, U.S.
- Bats: Right Throws: Right

Logan Layne Tanner (born November 10, 2000) is an American professional baseball pitcher in the Cincinnati Reds organization.

== Amateur career ==
Tanner attended George County High School in Lucedale, Mississippi. As a sophomore in 2017, he batted .305 with three home runs while also going 4-3 with a 1.22 ERA. He batted .341 with twenty RBIs alongside posting a 1.64 ERA and 114 strikeouts as a junior in 2018. Unselected in the 2019 Major League Baseball draft, he enrolled at Mississippi State University to play college baseball, where he committed to as a junior.

As a freshman at Mississippi State in 2020, Tanner appeared in 14 games and batted .268 with two home runs before the season was cancelled due to the COVID-19 pandemic. In 2021, as a redshirt freshman, he was the Bulldogs' starting catcher and slashed .287/.382/.525 with team-high 15 home runs and 53 RBIs over 67 games, leading Mississippi State to their first ever NCAA Championship. After the season, he was named to the USA Baseball Collegiate National Team. As a redshirt sophomore in 2022, Tanner returned as the Bulldogs' starting catcher and entered the season as a top prospect for the upcoming draft. Over 55 games, he batted .285 with seven home runs and 38 RBIs and earned spots on the All-SEC Second Team and the All-Defensive Team. Following the season's end, he traveled to San Diego where he participated in the Draft Combine.

== Professional career ==
Tanner was selected by the Cincinnati Reds in the second round with the 55th overall pick of the 2022 Major League Baseball draft. He signed with the team for $1 million. He made his professional debut with the Arizona Complex League Reds and was promoted to the Daytona Tortugas after one game. Over 17 games between the two teams, he hit .200 with one home run and seven RBIs. Tanner returned to Daytona for the 2023 season. He missed time due to injury but still played in 65 games, batting .202 with two home runs, 27 RBIs, and 15 doubles. Tanner was assigned to the Dayton Dragons for the 2024 season, and hit .185 with seven home runs over 69 games. He played only 12 games in 2025, with Dayton, and batted .121 across 33 at-bats.

Prior to the 2026 season, Tanner transitioned from catching to pitching. He appeared in 13 games between the ACL Reds and Daytona and had a 2-0 record, a 4.35 ERA, and 30 strikeouts.

== Personal life ==
Tanner's mother, Dalenah, played college softball for the Southern Miss Golden Eagles and was a member of the only two teams in the program's history to make the Women's College World Series in 1999 and 2000. Tanner’s father, Brandon Barthel, played college baseball as a pitcher for the University of Southern Mississippi, Delgado Community College, and the University of New Orleans.
