= Josh Kasevich =

American baseball player (born 2001)

Toronto Blue Jays
- Shortstop
- Born: January 17, 2001 (age 25); Palo Alto, California, U.S.
- Bats: Right Throws: Right

Joshua Mark Kasevich (born January 17, 2001) is an American professional baseball shortstop in the Toronto Blue Jays organization. He is ranked 12th on Major League Baseball's 2026 Top 30 Blue Jays prospects list.

== Amateur career ==
Kasevich attended Palo Alto High School in Palo Alto, California. After going 3–2 with a 2.10 ERA alongside batting .398 as a junior in 2018, he committed to play college baseball at the University of Oregon. He batted .407 with two home runs alongside going 5–1 with a 0.52 ERA as a senior in 2019. Unselected in the 2019 Major League Baseball draft, he enrolled at Oregon.

As a freshman at Oregon in 2020, Kasevich batted .135 over 37 at-bats before the season was cancelled due to the COVID-19 pandemic. As a redshirt freshman in 2021, he appeared in 55 games and slashed .324/.397/.444 with four home runs, fifty RBIs, and seven stolen bases. That summer, he played in the Northwoods League for the Waterloo Bucks. For the 2022 season, Kasevich played in 61 games and batted .310/.383/.445 with seven home runs, 44 RBIs, 16 strikeouts, and 24 walks. He was named First Team All Pac-12.

== Professional career ==
Kasevich was selected by the Toronto Blue Jays in the second round with the 60th overall pick of the 2022 Major League Baseball draft. He signed with the team for $1 million. He made his professional debut with the Dunedin Blue Jays, batting .262 with seven RBIs and eight doubles over 25 games. Kasevich played the 2023 season with the Vancouver Canadians with whom he hit .284 with four home runs and fifty RBIs over 94 games. He was assigned to the New Hampshire Fisher Cats to open the 2024 season. In early August, he was promoted to the Buffalo Bisons. Over 128 games, Kasevich hit .296 with six home runs, 64 RBIs, and 28 doubles.

Kasevich opened the 2025 season on the injured list with a back injury before rehabbing with the Florida Complex League Blue Jays and Dunedin in May. He suffered a wrist injury, and did not return to play for another two months. Kasevich returned healthy and was assigned to Buffalo in August. Over 29 games with Buffalo, he hit .173 with six RBIs. Kasevich was assigned to play in the Arizona Fall League with the Glendale Desert Dogs after the season. Kasevich was a non-roster invitee to 2026 spring training. He played the entirety of the 2026 season with Buffalo and batted .282 with four home runs and 47 RBIs over 130 games.

== Personal life ==
Kasevich's father is a professor at Stanford University and his brother played college baseball there.
