= Steele Hall (baseball) =

American baseball player (born 2007)

Cincinnati Reds
- Shortstop
- Born: July 24, 2007 (age 19); Mobile, Alabama, U.S.
- Bats: Right Throws: Right

Steele Hall (born July 24, 2007) is an American professional baseball shortstop in the Cincinnati Reds organization. He was drafted ninth overall by the Reds in the 2025 MLB draft.

== Amateur career ==
Hall attended Daphne High School in Daphne, Alabama for his freshman year of high school before transferring to Hewitt-Trussville High School in Trussville, Alabama for his sophomore & junior seasons. As a sophomore in 2024, he hit .331 with 23 runs batted in (RBI) and 31 stolen bases.

Hall reclassified from the 2026 to 2025 class. He was a top prospect for the 2025 Major League Baseball draft. He was committed to play college baseball at the University of Tennessee.

== Professional career ==
In the 2025 MLB draft, Hall was selected ninth overall by the Cincinnati Reds. On July 18, 2025, Hall signed with the Reds for a $5.75 million bonus.

Hall made his professional debut in 2026 with the Rookie-level Arizona Complex League Reds.
