= 2022 Major League Baseball draft =

Major League Baseball draft

General information
- Date: July 17–19, 2022
- Location: Xbox Plaza (L.A. Live); Los Angeles, California
- Networks: MLB Network; ESPN (first round)

Overview
- 616 total selections in 20 rounds
- First selection: Jackson Holliday; Baltimore Orioles
- First round selections: 39

The 2022 Major League Baseball draft took place on July 17–19, 2022, in Los Angeles. The draft assigned amateur baseball players to Major League Baseball (MLB) teams. The draft order was based on the reverse order of the 2021 MLB season standings. In addition, compensation picks were distributed for players who did not sign from the 2021 MLB draft.

Zach Neto made his MLB debut for the Los Angeles Angels on April 15, 2023, making him the first player from the 2022 draft to make his major league debut.

== Draft order ==
The order in which teams selected players was based on the reverse order of the final 2021 MLB season standings. The Baltimore Orioles, who had the worst record of the 2021 season, selected Jackson Holliday with the first overall pick in the draft. The New York Mets received the 11th pick as compensation for failing to sign Kumar Rocker. The Boston Red Sox received the 41st pick as compensation for failing to sign Jud Fabian. As a result of reaching the third surcharge tier of the competitive balance tax threshold in 2021, the Los Angeles Dodgers' top pick was moved down 10 slots.

== Future changes ==
On March 10, 2022, MLB and the Major League Baseball Players Association (MLBPA) came to an agreement on a new collective bargaining agreement (CBA). The new CBA instituted a draft lottery beginning with the 2023 MLB draft, with the first six picks being sorted via a lottery for the 18 teams that do not qualify for the postseason. There are limitations on teams participating in the lottery multiple years in a row, with separate limitations for revenue-sharing recipients and revenue-sharing payers. The draft will permanently switch to 20 rounds, with an annual pre-draft combine, and guarantees to draftees of 75% of their slot value provided that they submit to pre-draft physicals. A draft-and-follow option will be re-introduced for players drafted after the 10th round who do not sign before the signing deadline.

== Draft selections ==
The deadline for draftees to sign contracts was August 1, 2022.

Key
	All-Star
*	Player did not sign

=== First round ===
Pick	Player	Team	Position	School / Team
1	Jackson Holliday	Baltimore Orioles	Shortstop	Stillwater High School (OK)
2	Druw Jones	Arizona Diamondbacks	Outfielder	Wesleyan School (GA)
3	Kumar Rocker	Texas Rangers	Pitcher	Tri-City ValleyCats (Frontier League)
4	Termarr Johnson	Pittsburgh Pirates	Shortstop	Mays High School (GA)
5	Elijah Green	Washington Nationals	Outfielder	IMG Academy (FL)
6	Jacob Berry	Miami Marlins	Outfielder	LSU
7	Cade Horton	Chicago Cubs	Pitcher	Oklahoma
8	Brooks Lee	Minnesota Twins	Third baseman	Cal Poly
9	Gavin Cross	Kansas City Royals	Outfielder	Virginia Tech
10	Gabriel Hughes	Colorado Rockies	Pitcher	Gonzaga
11	Kevin Parada	New York Mets (Note: Compensation pick for failing to sign Kumar Rocker in the 2021 draft)	Catcher	Georgia Tech
12	Jace Jung	Detroit Tigers	Second baseman	Texas Tech
13	Zach Neto	Los Angeles Angels	Shortstop	Campbell
14	Jett Williams	New York Mets	Shortstop	Rockwall-Heath High School (TX)
15	Dylan Lesko	San Diego Padres	Pitcher	Buford High School (GA)
16	Chase DeLauter	Cleveland Guardians	Outfielder	James Madison
17	Justin Crawford	Philadelphia Phillies	Outfielder	Bishop Gorman High School (NV)
18	Cam Collier	Cincinnati Reds	Third baseman	Chipola College
19	Daniel Susac	Oakland Athletics	Catcher	Arizona
20	Owen Murphy	Atlanta Braves	Pitcher	Riverside Brookfield High School (IL)
21	Cole Young	Seattle Mariners	Shortstop	North Allegheny High School (PA)
22	Cooper Hjerpe	St. Louis Cardinals	Pitcher	Oregon State
23	Brandon Barriera	Toronto Blue Jays	Pitcher	American Heritage School (FL)
24	Mikey Romero	Boston Red Sox	Shortstop	Orange Lutheran High School (CA)
25	Spencer Jones	New York Yankees	Outfielder	Vanderbilt
26	Noah Schultz	Chicago White Sox	Pitcher	Oswego East High School (IL)
27	Eric Brown	Milwaukee Brewers	Shortstop	Coastal Carolina
28	Drew Gilbert	Houston Astros	Outfielder	Tennessee
29	Xavier Isaac	Tampa Bay Rays	First baseman	East Forsyth High School (NC)
30	Reggie Crawford	San Francisco Giants	Pitcher / First baseman	UConn

=== Compensatory round ===
Pick	Player	Team	Position	School
31	Sterlin Thompson	Colorado Rockies (Note: Compensation pick for the Boston Red Sox signing Trevor Story)	Outfielder	Florida
32	Sal Stewart	Cincinnati Reds (Note: Compensation pick for the Philadelphia Phillies signing Nick Castellanos)	Third baseman	Westminster Christian School (FL)

=== Competitive balance round A ===
Pick	Player	Team	Position	School
33	Dylan Beavers	Baltimore Orioles	Outfielder	California
34	Landon Sims	Arizona Diamondbacks	Pitcher	Mississippi State
35	JR Ritchie	Atlanta Braves (Note: Braves acquired the 35th pick from the Kansas City Royals for Drew Waters, Andrew Hoffmann, and CJ Alexander.)	Pitcher	Bainbridge High School (WA)
36	Thomas Harrington	Pittsburgh Pirates	Pitcher	Campbell
37	Justin Campbell	Cleveland Guardians	Pitcher	Oklahoma State
38	Jordan Beck	Colorado Rockies	Outfielder	Tennessee
39	Robby Snelling	San Diego Padres	Pitcher	Robert McQueen High School (NV)

=== Second round ===
Pick	Player	Team	Position	School
40	Dalton Rushing	Los Angeles Dodgers	Catcher	Louisville
41	Cutter Coffey	Boston Red Sox (Note: Compensation pick for failing to sign Jud Fabian in the 2021 draft)	Shortstop	Liberty High School (CA)
42	Max Wagner	Baltimore Orioles	Third baseman	Clemson
43	Ivan Melendez	Arizona Diamondbacks	First baseman	Texas
44	Hunter Barco	Pittsburgh Pirates	Pitcher	Florida
45	Jake Bennett	Washington Nationals	Pitcher	Oklahoma
46	Jacob Miller	Miami Marlins	Pitcher	Liberty Union High School (OH)
47	Jackson Ferris	Chicago Cubs	Pitcher	IMG Academy (FL)
48	Connor Prielipp	Minnesota Twins	Pitcher	Alabama
49	Cayden Wallace	Kansas City Royals	Third baseman	Arkansas
50	Jackson Cox	Colorado Rockies	Pitcher	Toutle Lake High School (WA)
51	Peyton Graham	Detroit Tigers	Shortstop	Oklahoma
52	Blade Tidwell	New York Mets	Pitcher	Tennessee
53	Adam Mazur	San Diego Padres	Pitcher	Iowa
54	Parker Messick	Cleveland Guardians	Pitcher	Florida State
55	Logan Tanner	Cincinnati Reds	Catcher	Mississippi State
56	Henry Bolte	Oakland Athletics	Outfielder	Palo Alto High School (CA)
57	Cole Phillips	Atlanta Braves	Pitcher	Boerne High School (TX)
58	Tyler Locklear	Seattle Mariners	First baseman	VCU
59	Brycen Mautz	St. Louis Cardinals	Pitcher	San Diego
60	Josh Kasevich	Toronto Blue Jays	Shortstop	Oregon
61	Drew Thorpe	New York Yankees	Pitcher	Cal Poly
62	Peyton Pallette	Chicago White Sox	Pitcher	Arkansas
63	Jacob Misiorowski	Milwaukee Brewers	Pitcher	Crowder College
64	Jacob Melton	Houston Astros	Outfielder	Oregon State
65	Brock Jones	Tampa Bay Rays	Outfielder	Stanford
66	Carson Whisenhunt	San Francisco Giants	Pitcher	East Carolina

=== Competitive balance round B ===
Pick	Player	Team	Position	School
67	Jud Fabian	Baltimore Orioles (Note: Orioles acquired Antonio Velez, Kevin Guerrero, a player to be named later, and the 67th pick from the Miami Marlins for Tanner Scott and Cole Sulser.)	Outfielder	Florida
68	Tanner Schobel	Minnesota Twins	Shortstop	Virginia Tech
69	Clark Elliott	Oakland Athletics	Outfielder	Michigan
70	Chandler Simpson	Tampa Bay Rays	Shortstop	Georgia Tech
71	Ryan Cermak	Tampa Bay Rays (Note: Rays acquired Isaac Paredes and the 71st pick from the Detroit Tigers for Austin Meadows.)	Outfielder	Illinois State
72	Robert Moore	Milwaukee Brewers	Shortstop	Arkansas
73	Justin Boyd	Cincinnati Reds	Outfielder	Oregon State
74	Walter Ford	Seattle Mariners	Pitcher	Pace High School (FL)

=== Compensatory round ===
Pick	Player	Team	Position	School
75	Nick Morabito	New York Mets (Note: Compensation pick for the Los Angeles Angels signing Noah Syndergaard)	Outfielder	Gonzaga College High School (DC)
76	Blake Burkhalter	Atlanta Braves (Note: Compensation pick for the Los Angeles Dodgers signing Freddie Freeman)	Pitcher	Auburn
77	Tucker Toman	Toronto Blue Jays (Note: Compensation pick for the Texas Rangers signing Marcus Semien)	Shortstop	Hammond School (SC)
78	Cade Doughty	Toronto Blue Jays (Note: Compensation pick for the Seattle Mariners signing Robbie Ray)	Second baseman	LSU
79	Roman Anthony	Boston Red Sox (Note: Compensation pick for the Detroit Tigers signing Eduardo Rodriguez)	Outfielder	Marjory Stoneman Douglas High School (FL)
80	Andrew Taylor	Houston Astros (Note: Compensation pick for the Minnesota Twins signing Carlos Correa)	Pitcher	Central Michigan

=== Other notable selections ===
Round	Pick	Player	Team	Position	School
3	81	Nolan McLean*	Baltimore Orioles	Pitcher	Oklahoma State
3	82	Nate Savino	Arizona Diamondbacks	Pitcher	Virginia
3	83	Jack Brannigan	Pittsburgh Pirates	Two-way player	Notre Dame
3	84	Trey Lipscomb	Washington Nationals	Third baseman	Tennessee
3	85	Karson Milbrandt	Miami Marlins	Pitcher	Liberty High School (MO)
3	87	Mason Barnett	Kansas City Royals	Pitcher	Auburn
3	88	Carson Palmquist	Colorado Rockies	Pitcher	Miami (FL)
3	89	Ben Joyce	Los Angeles Angels	Pitcher	Tennessee
3	90	Brandon Sproat*	New York Mets	Pitcher	Florida
3	91	Henry Williams	San Diego Padres	Pitcher	Duke
3	93	Gabriel Rincones Jr.	Philadelphia Phillies	Outfielder	Florida Atlantic
3	94	Bryce Hubbart	Cincinnati Reds	Pitcher	Florida State
3	95	Colby Thomas	Oakland Athletics	Outfielder	Mercer
3	96	Drake Baldwin	Atlanta Braves	Catcher	Missouri State
3	98	Alan Roden	Toronto Blue Jays	Outfielder	Creighton
3	99	Dalton Rogers	Boston Red Sox	Pitcher	Southern Miss
3	100	Trystan Vrieling	New York Yankees	Pitcher	Gonzaga
3	101	Jonathan Cannon	Chicago White Sox	Pitcher	Georgia
3	102	Dylan O'Rae	Milwaukee Brewers	Shortstop	Northern Collegiate Institute and Vocational School (Canada)
3	103	Michael Knorr	Houston Astros	Pitcher	Coastal Carolina
3	105	Alex Freeland	Los Angeles Dodgers	Shortstop	UCF
4	108	Dylan Ray	Arizona Diamondbacks	Pitcher	Alabama
4	109	Brock Porter	Texas Rangers	Pitcher	St. Mary's Preparatory (MI)
4	114	Andrew Morris	Minnesota Twins	Pitcher	Texas Tech
4	116	Ryan Ritter	Colorado Rockies	Shortstop	Kentucky
4	117	Troy Melton	Detroit Tigers	Pitcher	San Diego State
4	118	Jake Madden	Los Angeles Angels	Pitcher	Northwest Florida State
4	122	Alex McFarlane	Philadelphia Phillies	Pitcher	Miami (FL)
4	124	Jacob Watters	Oakland Athletics	Pitcher	West Virginia
4	125	David McCabe	Atlanta Braves	Third baseman	Charlotte
4	126	Ashton Izzi	Seattle Mariners	Pitcher	Oswego East High School (IL)
4	127	Jimmy Crooks	St. Louis Cardinals	Catcher	Oklahoma
4	129	Chase Meidroth	Boston Red Sox	Shortstop	San Diego
4	131	Jordan Sprinkle	Chicago White Sox	Shortstop	UC Santa Barbara
4	133	Trey Dombroski	Houston Astros	Pitcher	Monmouth
4	134	Dominic Keegan	Tampa Bay Rays	Catcher	Vanderbilt
5	137	Trace Bright	Baltimore Orioles	Pitcher	Auburn
5	141	Jared McKenzie	Washington Nationals	Outfielder	Baylor
5	142	Josh White	Miami Marlins	Pitcher	California
5	143	Brandon Birdsell	Chicago Cubs	Pitcher	Texas Tech
5	144	Ben Ross	Minnesota Twins	Infielder	Notre Dame College
5	150	Nathan Martorella	San Diego Padres	First baseman	California
5	152	Orion Kerkering	Philadelphia Phillies	Pitcher	South Florida
5	154	Jack Perkins	Oakland Athletics	Pitcher	Indiana
5	155	Nacho Alvarez Jr.	Atlanta Braves	Third baseman	Riverside Community College
5	157	Victor Scott II	St. Louis Cardinals	Outfielder	West Virginia
5	158	Mason Fluharty	Toronto Blue Jays	Pitcher	Liberty
5	160	Eric Reyzelman	New York Yankees	Pitcher	LSU
6	175	Hayden Dunhurst	Kansas City Royals	Catcher	Ole Miss
6	178	Víctor Mederos	Los Angeles Angels	Pitcher	Oklahoma State
6	179	Tyler Stuart	New York Mets	Pitcher	Southern Mississippi
6	180	Jakob Marsee	San Diego Padres	Outfielder	Central Michigan
6	181	Dylan DeLucia	Cleveland Guardians	Pitcher	Ole Miss
6	182	Mavis Graves	Philadelphia Phillies	Pitcher	Eastside High School (SC)
6	183	Zach Maxwell	Cincinnati Reds	Pitcher	Georgia Tech
6	187	Max Rajcic	St. Louis Cardinals	Pitcher	UCLA
6	189	Alex Hoppe	Boston Red Sox	Pitcher	UNC Greensboro
6	190	Chase Hampton	New York Yankees	Pitcher	Texas Tech
6	191	Eric Adler	Chicago White Sox	Pitcher	Wake Forest
6	194	Gary Gill Hill	Tampa Bay Rays	Pitcher	John F. Kennedy Catholic Preparatory School (NY)
6	196	Hayden Birdsong	San Francisco Giants	Pitcher	Eastern Illinois
7	198	Demetrio Crisantes	Arizona Diamondbacks	Shortstop	Nogales High School (AZ)
7	201	Riley Cornelio	Washington Nationals	Pitcher	TCU
7	206	Kody Huff	Colorado Rockies	Catcher	Stanford
7	220	Cam Schlittler	New York Yankees	Pitcher	Northeastern
7	223	A. J. Blubaugh	Houston Astros	Pitcher	Milwaukee
8	227	Cameron Weston	Baltimore Orioles	Pitcher	Michigan
8	234	Zebby Matthews	Minnesota Twins	Pitcher	Western Carolina
8	237	Jake Miller	Detroit Tigers	Pitcher	Valparaiso
8	253	Tyler Guilfoil	Houston Astros	Pitcher	Kentucky
8	256	Wade Meckler	San Francisco Giants	Outfielder	Oregon State
9	264	Cory Lewis	Minnesota Twins	Pitcher	UC Santa Barbara
10	292	Cade Gibson	Miami Marlins	Pitcher	Louisiana Tech
10	296	Zach Agnos	Colorado Rockies	Pitcher	East Carolina
10	304	Brock Rodden*	Oakland Athletics	Infielder	Wichita State
10	311	Tim Elko	Chicago White Sox	First baseman	Ole Miss
10	312	Brian Fitzpatrick	Milwaukee Brewers	Pitcher	Rutgers
10	313	Zach Cole	Houston Astros	Outfielder	Ball State
11	318	Spencer Giesting	Arizona Diamondbacks	Pitcher	Charlotte
11	319	Kohl Drake	Texas Rangers	Pitcher	Walters State Community College
11	324	Andrew Cossetti	Minnesota Twins	Catcher	Saint Joseph's
11	325	David Sandlin	Kansas City Royals	Pitcher	Oklahoma
11	328	Caden Dana	Los Angeles Angels	Pitcher	Don Bosco Preparatory High School (NJ)
11	329	Rhylan Thomas	New York Mets	Outfielder	USC
11	330	Isaiah Lowe	San Diego Padres	Pitcher	Combine Academy (NC)
11	335	Ian Mejia	Atlanta Braves	Pitcher	New Mexico State
11	337	Nathan Church	St. Louis Cardinals	Outfielder	UC Irvine
11	343	Ryan Clifford	Houston Astros	Outfielder	Crossroads FLEX High School (NC)
11	344	Drew Sommers	Tampa Bay Rays	Pitcher	Central Arizona College
12	358	Jared Southard	Los Angeles Angels	Pitcher	Texas
12	359	Paul Gervase	New York Mets	Pitcher	LSU
13	381	Marquis Grissom Jr.	Washington Nationals	Pitcher	Georgia Tech
13	384	C. J. Culpepper	Minnesota Twins	Pitcher	California Baptist
13	386	Blake Adams	Colorado Rockies	Pitcher	Kansas State
13	390	Graham Pauley	San Diego Padres	Infielder	Duke
13	399	Gavin Kilen*	Boston Red Sox	Shortstop	Milton High School (WI)
13	401	Mason Adams	Chicago White Sox	Pitcher	Jacksonville
13	405	Chris Newell	Los Angeles Dodgers	Outfielder	Virginia
15	445	Javier Vaz	Kansas City Royals	Outfielder	Vanderbilt
16	491	Tristan Stivors	Chicago White Sox	Pitcher	Texas State
16	495	Jared Karros	Los Angeles Dodgers	Pitcher	UCLA
17	497	Carter Young	Baltimore Orioles	Shortstop	Vanderbilt
17	508	Samy Natera	Los Angeles Angels	Pitcher	New Mexico State
17	525	Payton Martin	Los Angeles Dodgers	Pitcher	West Forsyth High School (NC)
18	552	Jurrangelo Cijntje*	Milwaukee Brewers	Shortstop	Champagnat Catholic School (FL)
19	578	Gage Stanifer	Toronto Blue Jays	Pitcher	Westfield High School (IN)

== Notes ==
Compensation picks

Trades
