= Arizona Complex League Reds =

- (1968–1973, 1984–1990, 1999–present); Goodyear, Arizona; Gulf Coast League Reds before 2010
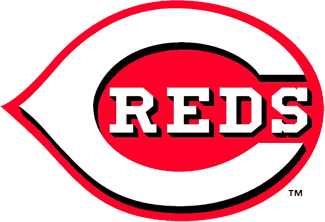

Team logo	Cap insignia

Minor league affiliations
- Class: Rookie
- League: Arizona Complex League
- Division: Central
- Previous leagues: Arizona League (2010–2020); Gulf Coast League (1968–1973, 1984–1990, 1999–2009)

Major league affiliations
- Team: Cincinnati Reds

Minor league titles
- Division titles (2): 1986; 2022

Team data
- Name: ACL Reds
- Previous names: AZL Reds (2010–2020); GCL Reds (1968–1973, 1984–1990, 1999–2009)
- Ballpark: Goodyear Ballpark (2010-present)
- Previous parks: Ed Smith Stadium (2004–2009)
- Owner/ Operator: Cincinnati Reds
- Manager: Bryan LaHair

The Arizona Complex League Reds are a Rookie-level affiliate of the Cincinnati Reds, competing in the Arizona Complex League of Minor League Baseball. The team plays its home games at Goodyear Ballpark in Goodyear, Arizona. The team is composed mainly of players who are in their first year of professional baseball either as draftees or non-drafted free agents from the United States, Canada, Dominican Republic, Venezuela, Cuba, Japan, and other countries.

== History ==
The Cincinnati Reds previously fielded a Rookie-level team in the Gulf Coast League (GCL) during three tenures (1968–1973, 1984–1990, and 1999–2009) known as the Gulf Coast League Reds. During 2004–2009, the team played home games at Ed Smith Stadium in Sarasota, Florida.

In 2010, when the major-league Reds moved their spring training headquarters from Florida to Arizona, the Rookie-level team also relocated and became members of the Arizona League (AZL), and were renamed as the Arizona League Reds. The team has competed in Arizona since then. Prior to the 2021 season, the Arizona League was renamed as the Arizona Complex League (ACL).

== Roster ==
Arizona Complex League Reds roster
Players	Coaches/Other
Pitchers: -- Bryce Archie; -- Jake Brink; -- Reid Clague; 39 Jesus Colina; 27 Abraham Gaitan; -- Griffin Green; -- Justin Henschel; 26 Lisnerkin Lantigua; -- Carson Latimer; -- Jordan Little; -- Kyle McCoy; -- Braden Osbolt; 71 Nelfri Payano; 72 Ayendy Pena; -- Dusty Revis; 50 Dominic Scheffler; -- Andrew Shaffner; 35 Stharlin Torres; 37 Deivi Villafana; -- Aaron Watson; Catchers: 9 Yanuel Casiano; -- Ian Francis; -- Henry Hunter; 99 Brandon Jaime; -- Dylan King; -- Jirvin Morillo; Infielders: 15 Anielson Buten; -- Ty Doucette; 31 Jalen Hairston; -- Steele Hall; -- Hansel Jimenez; -- Naibel Mariano; 48 Yael Romero; 41 Anthuan Valencia; Outfielders: -- Pablo Nunez; -- Eli Pitts; -- Adolfo Sanchez; 36 Yeycol Soriano	Manager: 34 Fred Corral; Coaches: 23 Sebastian Almonte (coach); 16 Cesar Garcia (coach); 60-day injured list: -- Edwin Cervantes; -- Khristian Guevara; 76 Christian Lopez; -- Maison Martinez (full season); -- Luis Pimentel; -- Owen Pote; -- Bryan Salgado; 7-day injured list; * On Cincinnati Reds 40-man roster; ~ Development list; # Rehab assignment; ∞ Reserve list; ‡ Restricted list; § Suspended list; † Temporarily inactive list; Roster updated March 27, 2026; Transactions; → More rosters: MiLB • Arizona Complex League; → Cincinnati Reds minor league players

== Season-by-season ==
Year	Record	Finish	Manager	Playoffs
GCL Reds
1968	28–33	5th	Bill Lajoie	No playoffs until 1983
1969	30–24	3rd	George Scherger	
1970	25–35	6th	Ron Plaza	
1971	23–29	4th	Ron Plaza	
1972	21–39	7th (t)	Ron Plaza	
1973	20–32	8th	Ron Plaza	
1984	32–31	5th	Sam Mejias	
1985	38–24	3rd (t)	Sam Mejias	
1986	34–28	1st	Sam Mejias	Lost League Finals vs. GCL Dodgers (1 game to 0)
1987	32–31	6th	Sam Mejias	
1988	21–42	10th (t)	Sam Mejias	
1989	37–26	4th (t)	Sam Mejias	
1990	36–27	3rd (t)	Sam Mejias	
1999	23–37	14th	Donnie Scott	
2000	14–41	13th	Luis Quiñones	
2001	36–22	3rd	Edgar Caceres	
2002	30–30	7th	Edgar Caceres	
2003	26–34	10th	Edgar Caceres	
2004	20–37	12th	Freddie Benavides	
2005	22–32	11th	Luis Aguayo	
2006	18–34	13th	Luis Aguayo	
2007	15–41	16th	Pat Kelly / Ron Ortegon / Rick Burleson	
2008	25–31	14th	Pat Kelly	
2009	28–27	8th	Pat Kelly	

Year	Record	Finish	Manager	Playoffs
AZL Reds
2010	31–24	4th (t)	Julio Garcia	Lost League Finals vs. AZL Brewers (1 game to 0); Won in 1st round vs. AZL Giants (1 game to 0)
2011	31–25	4th	Jose Nieves	Lost in 1st round vs. AZL Giants (1 game to 0)
2012	18–38	12th	Jose Nieves	
2013	18–37	13th	Eli Marrero	
2014	24–32	11th	Eli Marrero	
2015	27–29	8th	Ray Martinez	
2016	31–24	3rd	Jose Nieves	Lost in Semifinals vs. AZL Mariners (1 game to 0)
2017	22–33	13th	Jose Nieves	

== Notable players ==
Notable players for the team have included:

- Jared Burton
- Noah Davis
- Elly De La Cruz (born 2002)
- Yasmani Grandal
- Evan Kravetz
- Michael Lorenzen
- Kyle Lotzkar
- Donald Lutz
- Jon Moscot
- Nefi Ogando
- Wandy Peralta
- Denis Phipps
- Josh Ravin
- Steve Selsky
- Brett Tomko
- Zack Weiss
