= Elijah Green (baseball) =

American baseball player (born 2003)

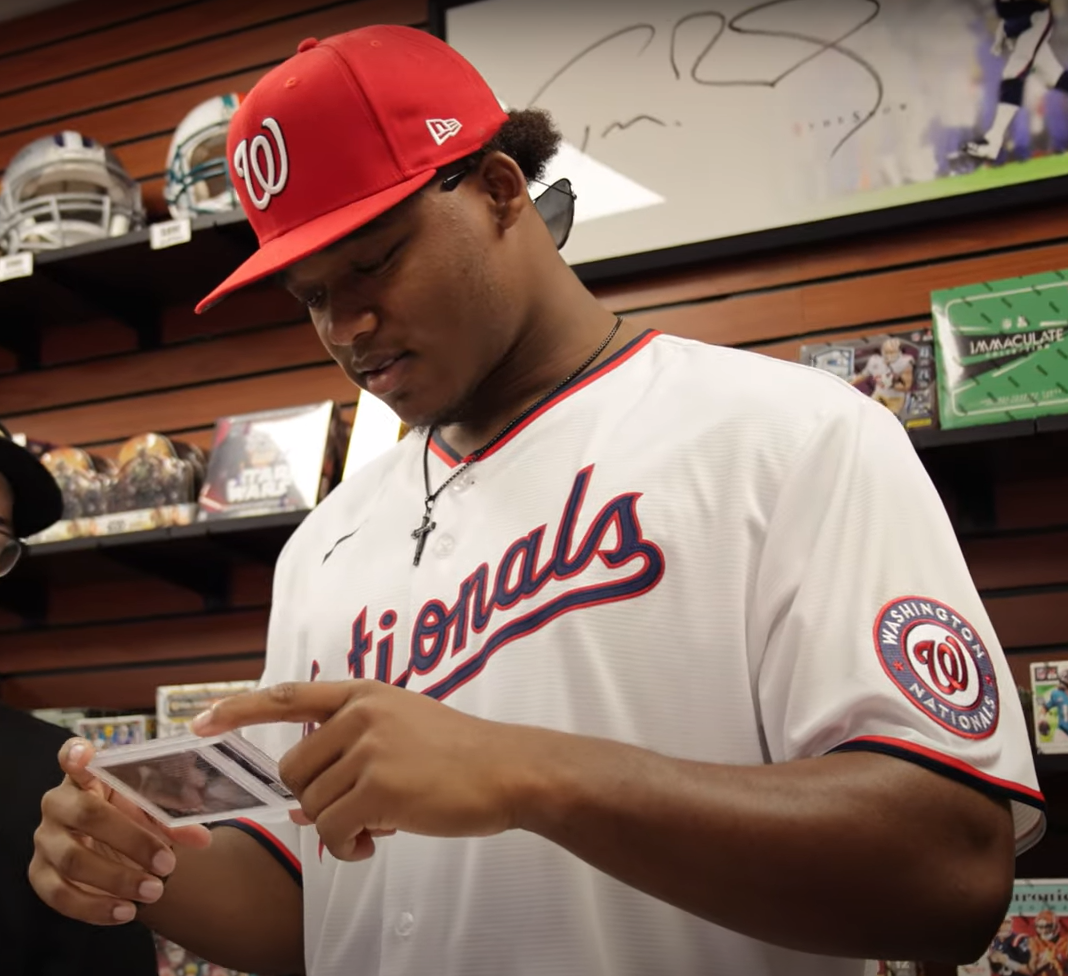
- Green c. 2023

Washington Nationals
- Outfielder
- Born: December 4, 2003 (age 22); Windermere, Florida, U.S.
- Bats: Right Throws: Right

Elijah Joseph Green (born December 4, 2003) is an American professional baseball outfielder in the Washington Nationals organization. The Nationals selected Green with the fifth overall pick of the 2022 Major League Baseball draft.

== Amateur career ==
Green attended the IMG Academy in Bradenton, Florida, and played for the school's baseball team. As a senior in 2022, he hit .462 with nine home runs. He committed to attend the University of Miami.

== Professional career ==
The Washington Nationals selected Green in the first round, with the fifth overall selection, of the 2022 MLB draft. He signed with the Nationals for a reported $6.5 million signing bonus.

Green made his professional debut with the Rookie-level Florida Complex League Nationals after signing and hit .302 with two home runs across 12 games. In 2023, Green played for the Single-A Fredericksburg Nationals, hitting .210/.323/.306 with four home runs, 36 RBI, and 30 stolen bases across 75 games. Green returned to Fredericksburg for the 2024 season and batted .208 with 13 home runs, 54 RBI, and 39 stolen bases across 109 games. In 2025, Green missed time due to a hamstring injury, but still appeared in 81 games between the Florida Complex League Nationals, Fredericksburg, and the High-A Wilmington Blue Rocks, hitting .224 with nine home runs and 28 RBI. He was assigned to Wilmington to open the 2026 season.

== Personal life ==
Green is the son of Eric Green, who played in the National Football League. In his youth, Elijah played football as a quarterback in the Amateur Athletic Union.
