= Cam Collier =

American baseball player (born 2004)

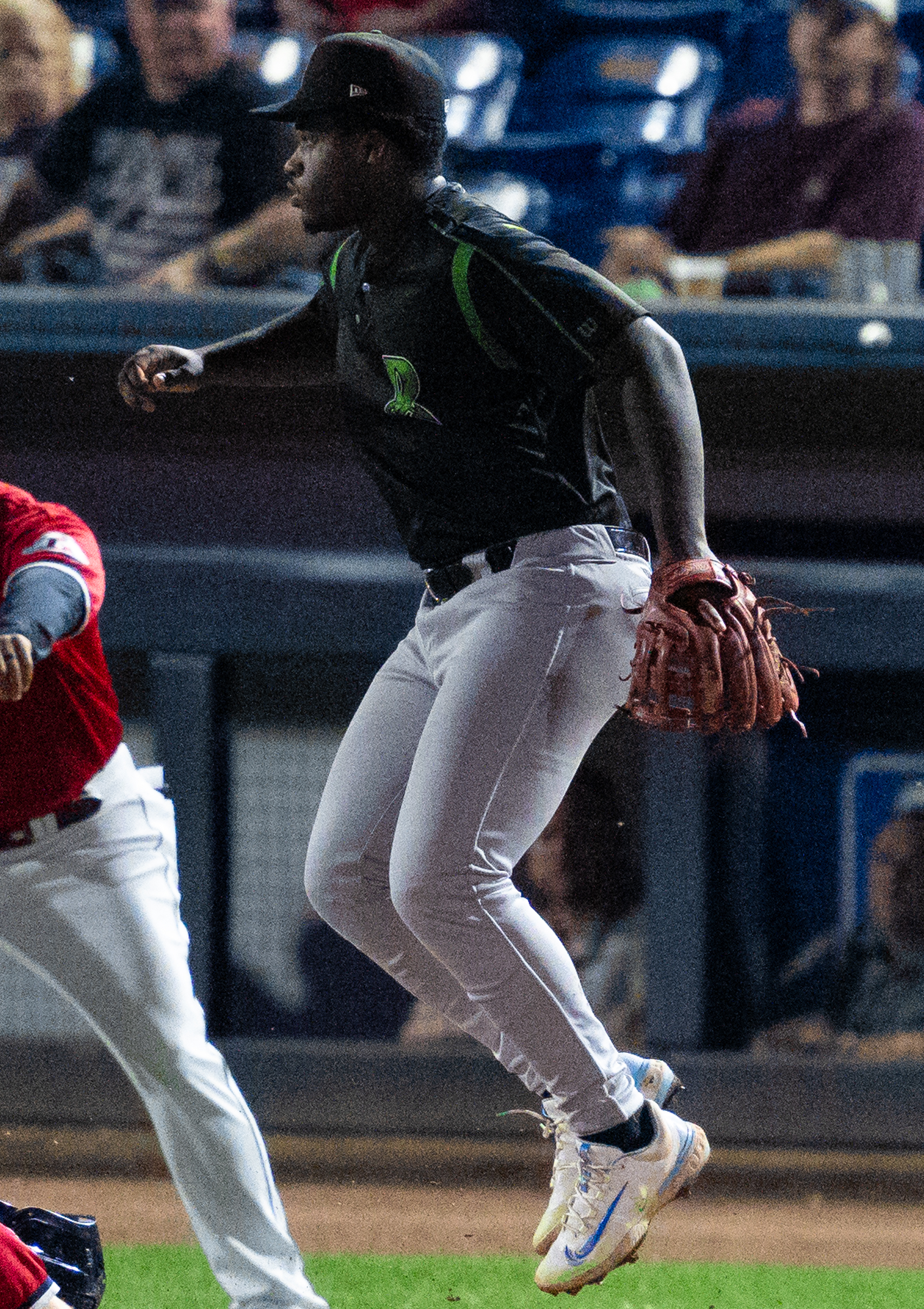
- Collier with the Dayton Dragons in 2024

Cincinnati Reds – No. 82
- Third baseman / First baseman
- Born: November 20, 2004 (age 21); Chicago, Illinois, U.S.
- Bats: Left Throws: Right

Cameron Keith Collier (born November 20, 2004) is an American professional baseball third baseman and first baseman in the Cincinnati Reds organization. He played college baseball for the Chipola Indians.

== Amateur career ==
Collier grew up in Austell, Georgia and attended Mount Paran Christian School in Kennesaw, Georgia. He committed to play college baseball at Louisville after his freshman year of high school. As a sophomore, Collier hit for a .434 average with 13 home runs, 40 RBIs, and 19 stolen bases. Collier played in the Perfect Game Junior National Showcase after the season. He was originally considered to be one of the best prospects in the 2023 Major League Baseball draft class. After his sophomore year Collier earned his General Educational Development (GED) and reclassified to the class of 2022.

After reclassifying, Collier enrolled at Chipola College in Marianna, Florida. He was named to the watchlist for the Golden Spikes Award entering his freshman season. Collier batted .333 with eight home runs and 47 RBIs in his freshman season. After the 2022 season, he played collegiate summer baseball for the Cotuit Kettleers of the Cape Cod Baseball League.

== Professional career ==
The Cincinnati Reds selected Collier in the first round, with the 18th overall selection, of the 2022 Major League Baseball draft. On July 25, 2022, Collier agreed to a $5 million contract with the Reds. He made his professional debut with the rookie-level Arizona Complex League Reds. Collier spent the 2023 season with the Single-A Daytona Tortugas, playing in 111 contests and hitting .246/.349/.356 with six home runs and 68 RBI. Collier is ranked the #9 Reds Prospect.

Collier appeared in the 2024 All-Star Futures Game. He hit a home run and won the game's most valuable player award. In 119 appearances for the High-A Dayton Dragons, Collier slashed .248/.355/.443 with 20 home runs and 74 RBI.

On March 9, 2025, it was announced that Collier would miss at least 4-6 weeks after suffering a torn UCL in his left thumb that required surgery.

On June 17, Collier was promoted to the Double-A Chattanooga Lookouts.

On June 27, Collier's bat erupted on a two home-run game with seven total RBI, his best offensive performance of the year.

== Personal life ==
Collier's father, Lou Collier, played in Major League Baseball and the KBO League.
