= Oregon Ducks baseball statistical leaders =

The Oregon Ducks baseball statistical leaders are individual statistical leaders of the Oregon Ducks baseball program in various categories, including batting average, home runs, runs batted in, runs, hits, stolen bases, ERA, and Strikeouts. Within those areas, the lists identify single-game, single-season, and career leaders. The Ducks represent the University of Oregon in the NCAA's Big Ten Conference.

Oregon began competing in intercollegiate baseball in 1906. These lists are updated through the end of the 2025 season.

== Batting Average ==
Career (Min. 170 ABs)
Rk	Player	AVG	Seasons
1	H.D. Murphy	.381	1963 1964
2	Drew Cowley	.373	2022 2023
3	Jim Willis	.372	1973 1974
4	Ellis Olson	.371	1957 1958
5	Dennis Baldridge	.358	1965 1966
	Joe Gordon	.358	1934 1935
7	Dave Roberts	.354	1970 1971 1972
	Earl Averill Jr.	.354	1951 1952 1953
9	Larry Hanson	.351	1967 1968
10	Dave Moore	.343	1960 1961

Season (Min. 3.0 PAs)
Rk	Player	AVG	Season
1	Len Read	.426	1958
2	Ellis Olson	.423	1958
3	Al Cohen	.414	1949
4	Dave Roberts	.410	1972
	Earl Averill Jr.	.410	1951
6	Jim Willis	.405	1973
7	Larry Hanson	.397	1967
8	Aaron Zavala	.392	2021
9	Bill Carney	.391	1942
10	Ed Davidson	.386	1961

== Home Runs ==
Career
Rk	Player	HR	Seasons
1	Jacob Walsh	59	2022 2023 2024 2025
2	Mason Neville	42	2024 2025
3	Maddox Molony	37	2024 2025 2026
4	Tanner Smith	31	2019 2020 2021 2022 2023
5	Tom Dodd	30	1977 1978 1979
6	Drew Smith	28	2023 2024 2025 2026
7	Guy Krause	27	1971 1972 1973 1974
8	Dominic Hellman	26	2023 2024 2025 2026
9	Shaun Chase	25	2012 2013 2014 2015
10	Kenyon Yovan	24	2017 2018 2019 2020 2021
	Anson Aroz	24	2022 2023 2024 2025

Season
Rk	Player	HR	Season
1	Mason Neville	26	2025
2	Jacob Walsh	19	2025
3	Jacob Walsh	18	2024
	Sabin Ceballos	18	2023
5	Kenyon Yovan	17	2021
	Anson Aroz	17	2025
7	Mason Neville	16	2024
	Drew Cowley	16	2023
	Jacob Walsh	16	2023
	Drew Smith	16	2026

Single Game
Rk	Player	HR	Season	Opponent
1	44 times	2	Most recent: Naulivou Lauaki Jr., 2026 vs. Nebraska	

== Runs Batted In ==
Career
Rk	Player	RBI	Seasons
1	Jacob Walsh	191	2022 2023 2024 2025
2	Tanner Smith	158	2019 2020 2021 2022 2023
3	Gabe Matthews	137	2017 2018 2019 2020 2021
4	Drew Smith	136	2023 2024 2025 2026
5	Spencer Steer	129	2017 2018 2019
6	Mitchell Tolman	128	2013 2014 2015
7	Ryon Healy	118	2011 2012 2013
8	Maddox Molony	115	2024 2025 2026
9	Kyle Garlick	108	2011 2012 2013 2014
10	Ryan Cooney	104	2024 2025 2026

Season
Rk	Player	RBI	Season
1	Sabin Ceballos	70	2023
	Drew Cowley	70	2023
3	Drew Smith	64	2026
4	Jacob Walsh	60	2025
5	Kenyon Yovan	57	2021
	Spencer Steer	57	2019
	Mason Neville	57	2025
8	Jacob Walsh	56	2024
	Anthony Hall	56	2022
	Ryon Healy	56	2013

Single Game
Rk	Player	RBI	Season	Opponent
1	Jack Marder	8	2010	Nevada
	Dominic Hellman	8	2025	Columbia

== Runs ==
Career
Rk	Player	R	Seasons
1	Tanner Smith	205	2019 2020 2021 2022 2023
2	Jacob Walsh	162	2022 2023 2024 2025
3	Gabe Matthews	135	2017 2018 2019 2020 2021
	Aaron Payne	135	2011 2012 2013 2014
5	J.J. Altobelli	127	2010 2011 2012 2013
6	Drew Smith	124	2023 2024 2025 2026
7	Maddox Molony	117	2024 2025 2026
8	Ryan Cooney	113	2024 2025 2026
9	Don Reynolds	111	1972 1973 1974 1975
	Ron Delplanche	111	1965 1966 1967

Season
Rk	Player	R	Season
1	Rikuu Nishida	67	2023
	Mason Neville	67	2025
3	Drew Cowley	64	2023
	Aaron Zavala	64	2021
5	Tanner Smith	58	2022
6	Colby Shade	55	2023
7	Jacob Walsh	54	2025
	Anson Aroz	54	2025
9	Anthony Hall	53	2022
	Josh Kasevich	53	2022
	Kenyon Yovan	53	2021
	Austin Grebeck	53	2016

Single Game
Rk	Player	R	Season	Opponent
1	Ryan Cooney	5	2025	Columbia

== Hits ==
Career
Rk	Player	H	Seasons
1	Tanner Smith	306	2019 2020 2021 2022 2023
2	Jacob Walsh	258	2022 2023 2024 2025
3	Gabe Matthews	246	2017 2018 2019 2020 2021
4	J.J. Altobelli	211	2010 2011 2012 2013
5	Drew Smith	210	2023 2024 2025 2026
6	Mitchell Tolman	196	2013 2014 2015
7	Ryon Healy	194	2011 2012 2013
8	Danny Pulfer	193	2009 2010 2011
9	Kyle Kasser	178	2015 2016 2017 2018
10	Spencer Steer	177	2017 2018 2019

Season
Rk	Player	H	Season
1	Drew Cowley	85	2023
	Tanner Smith	85	2022
3	Brennan Milone	83	2022
4	Ryan Cooney	82	2026
5	KC Serna	81	2010
6	Tanner Smith	80	2023
7	Rikuu Nishida	79	2023
	Ryon Healy	79	2012
	Danny Pulfer	79	2011
10	Aaron Zavala	78	2021

Single Game
Rk	Player	H	Season	Opponent
1	2 times	6	Most recent: Anthony Hall, 2021 vs. Central Connecticut State	

== Stolen Bases ==
Career
Rk	Player	SB	Seasons
1	Aaron Payne	49	2011 2012 2013 2014
2	Don Reynolds	40	1972 1973 1974 1975
3	Scott Heineman	38	2012 2013 2014 2015
4	KC Serna	35	2009 2010 2011
5	Don Banderas	33	1963 1964 1965
6	Colby Shade	31	2021 2022 2023 2024
	Tanner Smith	31	2019 2020 2021 2022 2023
8	Ryan Cooney	28	2024 2025 2026
9	Bryce Boettcher	27	2021 2022 2023 2024
	Dean Roberts	27	1972 1973 1974 1975
	Jim Pifher	27	1956 1957 1958
	George Shaw	27	1952 1953 1954 1955

Season
Rk	Player	SB	Season
1	Rikuu Nishida	25	2023
2	Don Banderas	18	1965
3	Aaron Payne	17	2014
4	Jack Brooks	16	2026
	Colby Shade	16	2022
	Scott Heineman	16	2015
	Aaron Payne	16	2013
	Aaron Payne	16	2012
	Caleb Tommasini	16	2009
10	Bryce Boettcher	15	2024
	Trev Swangard	15	1962
	Wimp Hastings	15	1958
	Ryan Cooney	15	2025

Single Game
Rk	Player	SB	Season	Opponent
1	11 times	3	Most recent: Maddox Molony, 2025 vs. Oregon State	

== Earned Run Average ==
Career
Rk	Player	ERA	Seasons
1	Robbie Snow	1.49	1962 1963 1964
2	Arba Ager	1.59	1962 1963 1964
3	Wally Palmberg	2.06	1963 1964 1965
4	Thatch McLeod	2.12	1962 1963 1964
5	Tommy Thorpe	2.14	2012 2013 2014
6	Bob Claydon	2.22	1970 1971 1972
7	Don Lane	2.29	1956 1957 1958
8	Bob Christianson	2.31	1960 1961 1962
9	Mike Shoup	2.53	1971 1972 1973
10	Jon Wheeler	2.55	1967 1968 1969

Season (MIN. 1.0 INN. PER GAME)
Rk	Player	ERA	Season
1	Whitney Lokan	0.97	1948
2	Eric Olson	0.99	1968
3	Robbie Snow	1.08	1964
4	Arba Ager	1.17	1964
	Thatch McLeod	1.17	1963
6	Arba Ager	126	1963
7	Robbie Snow	1.35	1962
8	Jon Wheeler	1.44	1967
9	Jon Swanson	1.53	1962
10	Done Lane	1.61	1956

== Strikeouts ==
Career
Rk	Player	K	Seasons
1	Tyler Anderson	285	2009 2010 2011
2	David Peterson	282	2015 2016 2017
3	Grayson Grinsell	267	2023 2024 2025
4	Alex Keudell	247	2009 2010 2011 2012
5	Tommy Thorpe	225	2012 2013 2014
6	Jon Wheeler	222	1967 1968 1969
7	Cole Irvin	197	2013 2014 2015 2016
8	Cullen Kafka	195	2018 2019 2020 2021
9	Robbie Snow	183	1962 1963 1964
10	Dean Kegler	181	1978 1979 1980 1981

Season
Rk	Player	K	Season
1	David Peterson	140	2017
2	Will Sanford	126	2026
3	Tyler Anderson	114	2011
4	Tyler Anderson	105	2010
5	Ryne Nelson	104	2019
6	Grayson Grinsell	101	2025
7	Grayson Grinsell	99	2024
8	Kenyon Yovan	98	2018
9	Cole Irvin	93	2016
	Jimmie Sherfy	93	2012

Single Game
Rk	Player	K	Season	Opponent
1	David Peterson	20	2017	Arizona State
