= Scott Kingery =

American baseball player (born 1994)

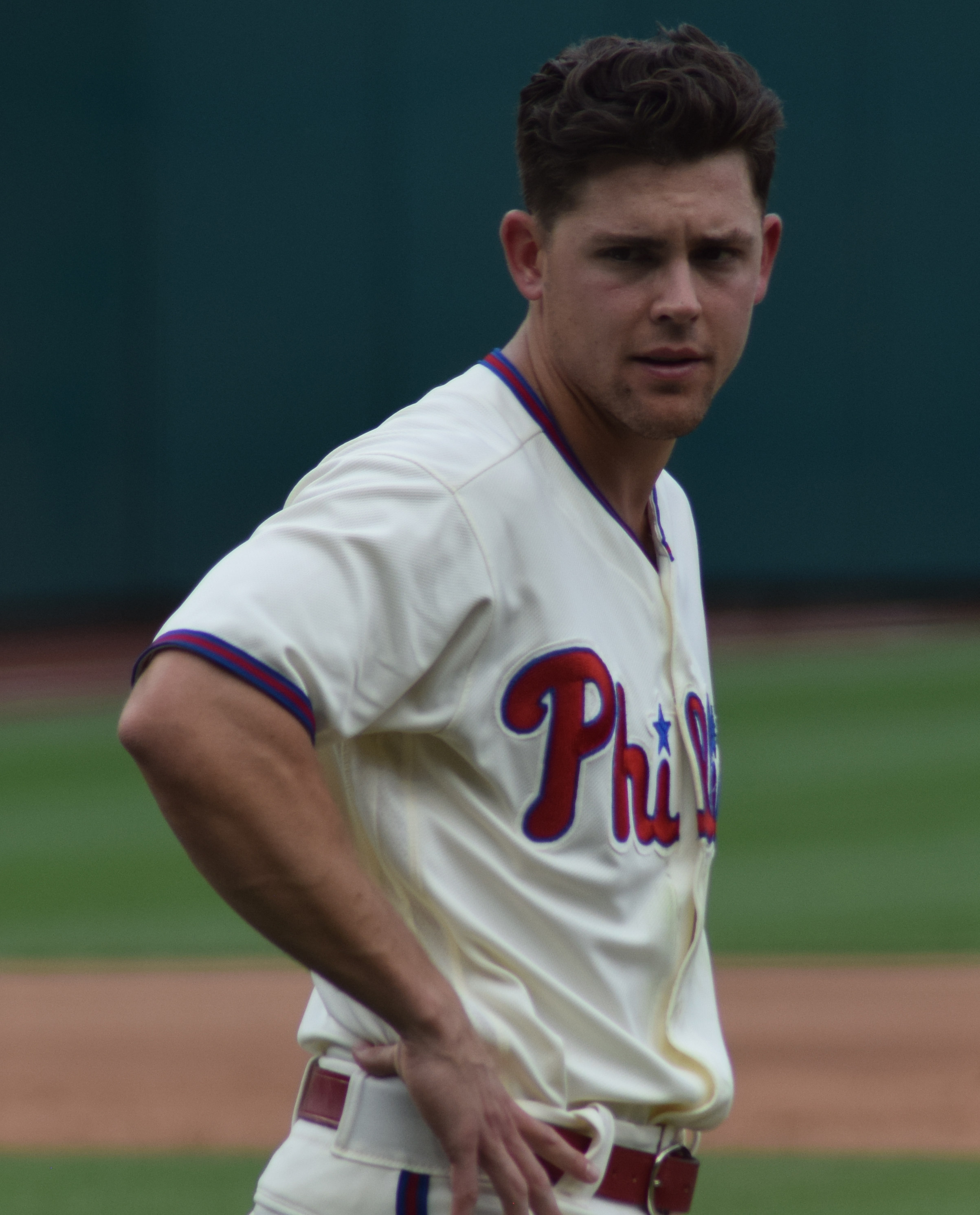
- Kingery with the Philadelphia Phillies in 2018

Free agent
- Utility player
- Born: April 29, 1994 (age 32); Phoenix, Arizona, U.S.
- Bats: Right Throws: Right

MLB debut
- March 30, 2018, for the Philadelphia Phillies

MLB statistics (through April 23, 2026)
- Batting average: .227
- Home runs: 30
- Runs batted in: 96
- Stats at Baseball Reference

Teams
- Philadelphia Phillies (2018–2022); Los Angeles Angels (2025); Chicago Cubs (2026)

Scott Michael Kingery (born April 29, 1994) is an American professional baseball utility player who is a free agent. He has previously played in Major League Baseball (MLB) for the Philadelphia Phillies, Los Angeles Angels, and Chicago Cubs. The Phillies selected Kingery in the second round, 48th overall, of the 2015 MLB draft, and he played with them from 2018 to 2022.

Born and raised in Phoenix, Arizona, Kingery's baseball career began with a trip to the 2006 Little League World Series. From there, he attended Mountain Pointe High School, where college recruiters overlooked his skill at shortstop due to his small frame. Kingery originally committed to play college baseball for Central Arizona College but ultimately accepted an offer to play for the Arizona Wildcats baseball team as a preferred walk-on. He played his first two seasons in the outfield before switching to second base as a junior in 2015; there, Kingery was named the Pac-12 Conference Baseball Player of the Year and was a finalist for the Golden Spikes Award.

After signing with Philadelphia in 2015, Kingery spent the next three seasons rising through the Phillies' farm system, including an appearance at the 2017 All-Star Futures Game. The Phillies signed Kingery to a six-year contract extension just before the 2018 season, and he made his major league debut that opening day. The Phillies told Kingery, who had primarily played middle infield positions, that he was to be used as a utility player, and he spent the bulk of his rookie season at shortstop. The following year, a depleted Phillies bench pushed Kingery to the outfield as his batting average and home run numbers continued to improve. Kingery's career suffered in 2020 due to lingering effects of the COVID-19 virus, and on June 7, 2021, he was designated for assignment and outrighted to the minor leagues.

On November 1, 2024, Kingery was traded to the Los Angeles Angels for cash considerations.

== Early life ==
Scott Michael Kingery was born on April 29, 1994, in Phoenix, Arizona. His father Tom was a corporate account manager for American Express, while his mother Patti taught preschool for a private school in the Phoenix area. Kingery and his twin brother Sam both played baseball from the age of five, with their father serving as their coach through 2006, when the Kingery family appeared in the Little League World Series. The Kingerys' Ahwatukee Foothills Little League team won the West Region to advance to the World Series in Williamsport, Pennsylvania; Scott played shortstop, while Sam was at second base. Kingery and the rest of the Ahwatukee team were eliminated in the semifinals, losing a head-to-head matchup against a team from Columbus, Georgia.

Always small for his age, Kingery's childhood role model was Dustin Pedroia, who was playing college baseball at the time for the Arizona State Sun Devils. Pedroia, who ended up playing in Major League Baseball for the Boston Red Sox, was a similarly undersized middle infielder, and Kingery modeled his playing style after that fashion. While Kingery played baseball at Mountain Pointe High School in Ahwatukee, his coach said that he had "that 'it' factor ... He just knew how to make plays and just did things that just separated him from everybody else." As a junior during the 2011 high school baseball season, Kingery batted .495 with 10 home runs and 39 runs batted in (RBIs). He posted similar numbers as a senior, batting .485 with eight home runs and 36 RBIs.

== College career ==
Despite the strong offensive numbers that Kingery put up in high school, he was overlooked by many college baseball coaches because of his short stature; by his high school graduation, Kingery was only 5 feet 7 inches (1.70 m) tall. He initially committed to play for Central Arizona College, but was told by a number of NCAA Division I schools that, should some of the players that they recruited decide to play professionally out of high school, there might be room for Kingery on the team. Kingery sent a number of emails to Division I coaches and eventually received an offer from the University of Arizona to play on the team as a recruited walk-on.

Because the Arizona Wildcats baseball team had a number of shortstop options when Kingery was a freshman, he was assigned to play in center field for his first two seasons of college play. As a freshman in 2012, Kingery batted .261 in 30 starts, with 30 hits and 22 runs scored in 41 total appearances. The following year, he pushed his batting average up to .354, with 26 RBIs and 19 stolen bases, enough for an All-Pac-12 Conference team selection. The summer after his sophomore year of college, Kingery played for the Brewster Whitecaps of the Cape Cod Baseball League, a wooden bat collegiate summer baseball league. In 33 Cape Cod games, Kingery batted .312 with five doubles, one triple, and two home runs, and he played in the Cape Cod All-Star game.

As a junior during the 2015 college baseball season, Kingery moved from the outfield to second base. There, he led the Pac-12 Conference with a .392 batting average, 53 runs scored, 93 hits, and 133 total bases. Additionally, he recorded 15 doubles, five triples, five home runs, 36 RBIs, and 11 stolen bases in 54 games. Defensively, Kingery had a .975 fielding percentage and was named to the Pac-12 All-Defensive team, as well as the All-Pac-12 team. At the end of the season, Kingery was named the Pac-12 Conference Baseball Player of the Year; he was the first Wildcat to receive the award since Alex Mejia in 2012. Kingery was also a finalist for the 2015 Golden Spikes Award, given to the best college baseball player in the US.

== Professional career ==
=== Philadelphia Phillies ===
==== Minor leagues ====
The Philadelphia Phillies of Major League Baseball (MLB) selected Kingery in the second round, 48th overall, of the 2015 MLB draft. Kingery's middle infield partner, shortstop Kevin Newman, had been taken 17th overall by the Pittsburgh Pirates. Kingery signed with the Phillies on June 16, 2015, for a signing bonus of $1,259,600. He began his professional baseball career as the starting second baseman for the Single–A Lakewood BlueClaws of the South Atlantic League, where he posted a .250 average with three home runs, 21 RBIs, and 43 runs scored in 252 at bats.

Going into the 2016 Minor League Baseball (MiLB) season, Kingery was assigned to the High–A Clearwater Threshers of the Florida State League, where he served as the team's second baseman and leadoff hitter. He spent the majority of the season there, receiving midseason and post-season Florida State League All-Star honors and batting .293 with 29 doubles, three home runs, and 26 stolen bases in 94 games. Towards the end of the season, Kingery was promoted to the Double-A Reading Fightin Phils, where the physical toll of his first full season of professional baseball slowed his bat and his eye at the plate. In his 25 games with Reading during the 2016 season, Kingery batted only .214, striking out 26 times. After the regular minor league season ended, Kingery was selected to serve as the leadoff hitter for the Scottsdale Scorpions of the Arizona Fall League. In 20 fall games, Kingery batted .234, with one home run, six RBIs, and eight runs scored.

The Phillies invited Kingery to his first spring training prior to the 2017 season. He made a strong impression there, batting .286 with two home runs and a stolen base in 10 Grapefruit League games before heading back to Reading for the start of the season. Kingery, who had spent the 2016–17 offseason working on weight training and improving his swing, led all of minor league baseball with 16 home runs in his first 45 games, only one fewer than the MLB-leading Aaron Judge. After batting .313 in 69 Eastern League games, with a .379 on-base percentage and a .987 on-base plus slugging, Kingery was promoted to the Triple-A Lehigh Valley IronPigs on June 26, 2017, exactly two years after he had made his professional baseball debut with Lakewood. Kingery and fellow Phillies prospect Rhys Hoskins were both selected for the 2017 All-Star Futures Game, only three games after Kingery's promotion to Triple-A. Despite his breakout season, Kingery was considered unlikely to make his major-league debut in 2017, as he was not yet eligible for the Rule 5 draft and the Phillies had veteran César Hernández at second base. Kingery finished his Triple-A season batting .294 with eight home runs, 21 RBIs, and 41 runs scored in 265 at bats. At the end of the season, Baseball America named Kingery to their Minor League All-Star Second Team, while the Phillies awarded him the Paul Owens Award, given to the top position player in the organization's farm system.

==== Major leagues ====
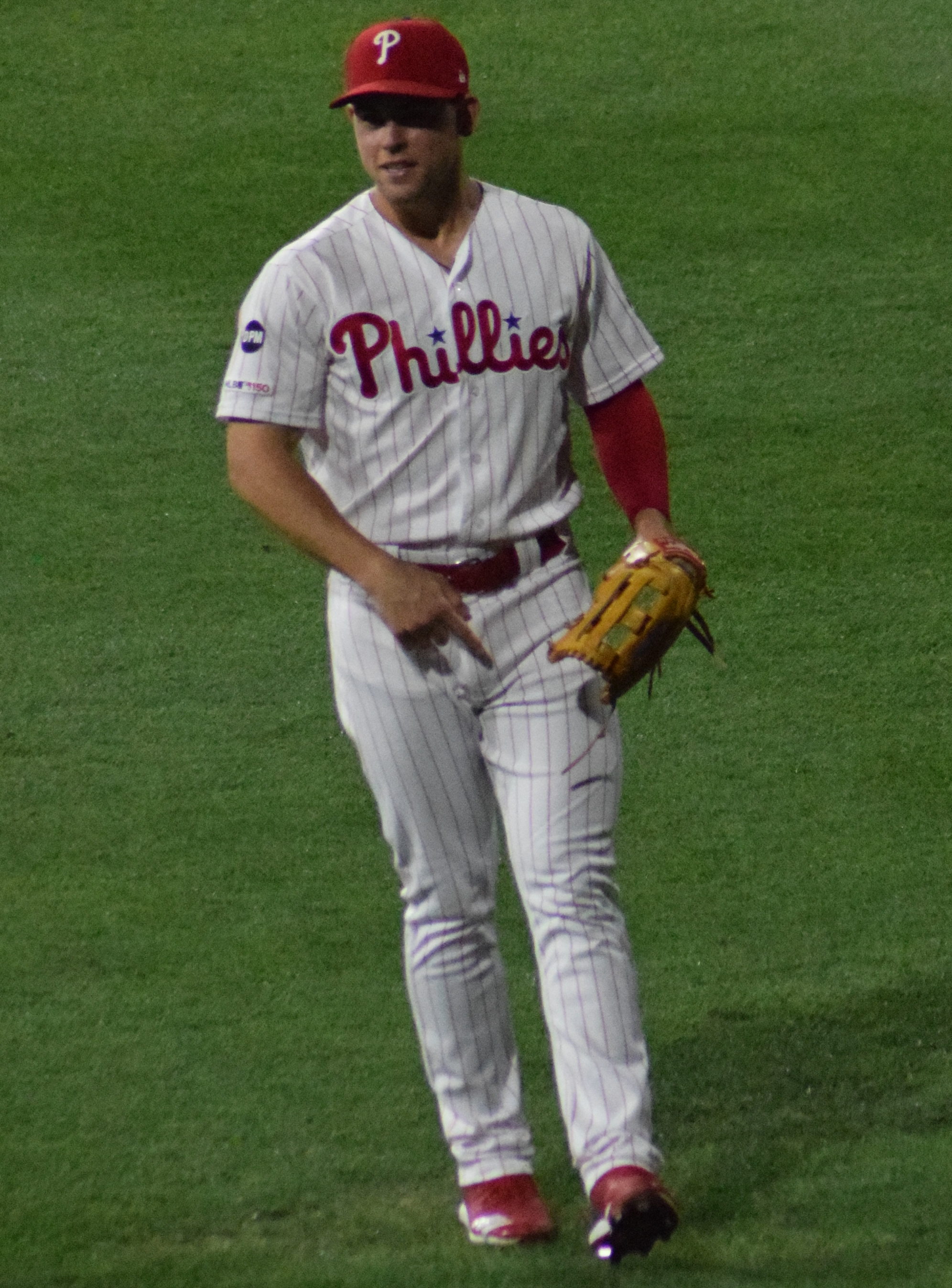
Kingery with the Phillies in 2019

Kingery received another spring training invitation prior to the 2018 MLB season. In 20 Grapefruit League games, he batted .381 with a .415 on-base percentage and a .725 slugging percentage. On March 25, 2018, the Phillies announced that they had signed Kingery to a six-year, $24 million contract extension and added him to their 2018 opening day roster. He started at third base for the season opener against the Atlanta Braves and collected two hits in his major league debut. It was the first time that a Phillies rookie had more than one hit in his major league debut since Domonic Brown in 2010. In a three-game series against the Cincinnati Reds in April, Kingery collected a series of firsts. On April 9, 2018, he recorded his first major league home run as part of the Phillies' 6–5 win. The next day, he recorded a grand slam in a 6–1 rout of Cincinnati. Finally, on April 11, he finished the series with his first career walkoff, a sacrifice fly that brought Pedro Florimon home to beat the Reds 4–3 in extra innings.

Prior to the 2018 season, the Phillies had informed Kingery, who had primarily played second base up until that point, that he would have no set position in the infield. He played primarily at shortstop while J. P. Crawford was on the disabled list; after Crawford returned, manager Gabe Kapler kept Kingery at shortstop and pushed Crawford to third base. On August 16, Kingery was called upon to pitch in the first game of a doubleheader against the New York Mets, allowing two runs in the final 1 1/3 innings of a 24–4 New York rout; the final score set a Mets franchise record for most runs in a single game. Kingery finished his rookie season batting .226 with eight home runs, 38 RBIs, and 55 runs in 452 at bats. He played 119 games at shortstop, 10 at third base, four at second base, and seven in the outfield.

Kingery, disappointed with his hitting production as a rookie, spent the 2018–19 offseason training with his longtime exercise partner Judge and private hitting coach Richard Schenck to improve his plate discipline. This training was reflected during the season, when Kingery swung at 9.1 percent more pitches in the strike zone and 5.8 percent fewer pitches outside of it. Although he played in 21 fewer games during the 2019 season, Kingery had better offensive numbers, batting .258 with 19 home runs. His position within the team, both offensively and defensively, continued to fluctuate. When outfielder Andrew McCutchen suffered a season-ending knee injury, the Phillies used Kingery as one of several leadoff batting options. McCutchen's injury, combined with Odúbel Herrera's suspension for a domestic violence incident, pushed Kingery to center field for the majority of the season.

When MLB suspended operations during 2020 spring training due to the COVID-19 pandemic, Kingery returned to the Phoenix area and began to practice with a small group of friends. There, he contracted the COVID-19 virus, and was required to quarantine away from the Phillies as MLB began to resume operations. He entered the summer training camp late and played with the team when the 2020 MLB season began on July 24, but recurrent back and shoulder pain, as well as lingering effects of the virus, continued to impact Kingery throughout early-season games. The Phillies intended to keep Kingery primarily at second base during the season, but injuries and subpar positional performances from a number of Phillies players, including Kingery, forced him to return to the utility role again. He played in just 36 games of the pandemic-shortened season and saw his batting average fall to .159.

After he struggled in 2021 spring training, going 7 for 44 with 19 strikeouts, the Phillies optioned Kingery to Lehigh Valley on March 28. He continued to struggle with hitting in the minor leagues, and was passed over for several major league call-ups until April 21, when Jean Segura suffered a muscle strain and regular bench infielder Ronald Torreyes became unavailable due to COVID protocols. The Phillies attempted to place Kingery on waivers that May but recalled them after he suffered a concussion in a game against the Toronto Blue Jays. On June 7, 2021, Kingery was designated for assignment; at the time, he had only seen 19 at bats for the season. Kingery cleared waivers the next day, was outrighted from the 40-man roster, and was assigned to Lehigh Valley. On July 18, 2021, the Phillies announced that Kingery had undergone shoulder surgery for a glenoid labrum injury and that he would miss the remainder of the 2021 season. In 15 major league games, Kingery went 1 for 19 with 12 strikeouts. He also appeared in 23 games for Lehigh Valley, batting .181 with five RBIs in 72 at bats.

Kingery missed the start of the regular season with a shoulder injury, and was assigned to Triple-A Lehigh Valley once healthy. He hit .185 with 1 home run, 6 RBI, and 2 stolen bases over 16 games. On June 7, 2022, Kingery was selected to the 40-man and active rosters after Johan Camargo was placed on the injured list. On June 10, after appearing in just one game, he was removed from the roster and sent outright to Triple–A Lehigh Valley.

Kingery spent the entirety of the 2023 season with Triple–A Lehigh Valley. Playing in 117 games, he batted .244/.325/.400 with 13 home runs, 47 RBI, and 24 stolen bases. On November 3, 2023, the Phillies declined Kingery's option for the 2024 season. However, due to the length of his initial minor league contract he signed upon being drafted, Kingery remained with the organization.

Kingery played in 125 games for Triple–A Lehigh Valley, slashing .268/.316/.488 with 25 home runs, 67 RBI, and 25 stolen bases.

=== Los Angeles Angels ===
On November 1, 2024, the Phillies traded Kingery to the Los Angeles Angels in exchange for cash considerations. He was added to the Angels' 40-man roster on November 4. On March 17, 2025, Kingery was designated for assignment following the acquisition of Ángel Perdomo. He cleared waivers and was sent outright to the Triple-A Salt Lake Bees on March 22. While playing for the Bees, Kingery hit a combined .373/.418/.578 in the hitter-friendly Pacific Coast League—numbers that were inflated by a .433 batting average on balls in play. On May 28, the Angels selected Kingery's contract, adding him to their active roster as a replacement for the struggling Tim Anderson. In 14 appearances for Los Angeles, he went 4-for-25 (.160) with one stolen base and two walks. Kingery was designated for assignment by the Angels on August 11. He cleared waivers and was sent outright to Triple-A Salt Lake on August 13. On September 1, the Angels added Kingery back to their active roster. In five appearances for Los Angeles, he received only two plate appearances, going hitless in both. Kingery was designated for assignment again on September 13, following the promotion of Denzer Guzmán. He was sent outright to Salt Lake after clearing waivers on September 15. Kingery elected free agency on September 29.

=== Chicago Cubs ===
On December 2, 2025, Kingery signed a minor league contract with the Chicago Cubs. On March 25, 2026, the Cubs selected Kingery's contract after he made the team's Opening Day roster. He made eight appearances for Chicago, going 1-for-4 (.250) with one stolen base. On April 24, Kingery was designated for assignment by the Cubs. He cleared waivers and was sent outright to the Triple-A Iowa Cubs on April 27. In 39 appearances for Iowa, Kingery batted .200/.277/.304 with three home runs, 12 RBI, and three stolen bases. He was released by the Cubs organization on July 19.

== Player profile ==
Offensively, Kingery's approach to the plate originates from his work in 2017 with Schenck, who Kingery claims teaches players to hit based on "the opposite of what you've always been taught". He has continued to make adjustments to his stance and swinging extension throughout his major league career in response to an inconsistent plate production. Heading into the 2021 season, manager Joe Girardi focused on improving the quality of Kingery's at bats by encouraging him to focus on finding gaps in the field and hit more line drives.

Primarily a second baseman throughout his college and minor league career, Kingery became a utility player upon his promotion to the majors. In 2021, he attributed his decreased confidence during major league play to this ever-changing role, telling reporters that, when he was at the plate, he was often thinking more about his position on the field than the ball in front of him. Frequently changing positions also took a physical toll on Kingery, who would regularly lose 10 pounds (4.5 kg) over the course of a season.

== Personal life ==
Kingery has an identical twin brother named Sam. The two played baseball together through high school, but Sam chose to attend Northern Arizona University for his first year of college. He transferred to Arizona as a sophomore and tried out for the baseball team as a walk-on, but was not selected.
