= Bruce Zimmermann =

American baseball player (born 1995)

Hanwha Eagles – No. 12
- Pitcher
- Born: February 9, 1995 (age 31); Baltimore, Maryland, U.S.
- Bats: Left Throws: Left

Professional debut
- MLB: September 17, 2020, for the Baltimore Orioles
- KBO: July 26, 2026, for the Hanwha Eagles

MLB statistics (through 2026 season)
- Win–loss record: 8–11
- Earned run average: 5.63
- Strikeouts: 129

KBO statistics (through August 21, 2026)
- Win–loss record: 0–2
- Earned run average: 13.50
- Strikeouts: 10
- Stats at Baseball Reference

Teams
- Baltimore Orioles (2020–2023); Milwaukee Brewers (2025); St. Louis Cardinals (2026); Hanwha Eagles (2026–present)

Bruce Anthony Zimmermann (born February 9, 1995) is an American professional baseball pitcher for the Hanwha Eagles of the KBO League. He has previously played in Major League Baseball (MLB) for the Baltimore Orioles, Milwaukee Brewers, and St. Louis Cardinals.

== Amateur career ==
Zimmermann graduated from Loyola Blakefield in 2013. Undrafted out of high school in the 2013 Major League Baseball draft, he enrolled at Towson University to play college baseball. He transferred to the University of Mount Olive after his sophomore year. In 2017, as a senior at Mount Olive, he was 9–2 with a 3.18 ERA in 15 starts, striking out 129 batters in 99 innings.

== Professional career ==
=== Atlanta Braves ===
After Zimmermann's senior year, he was selected by the Atlanta Braves in the fifth round of the 2017 Major League Baseball draft. He signed for $10,000, and was assigned to the Danville Braves, where he was 0–1 with a 3.09 ERA in 11 starts. He began 2018 with the Rome Braves, with whom he was named a South Atlantic League All-Star, before being promoted to the Mississippi Braves in June.

=== Baltimore Orioles ===
On July 31, 2018, Zimmermann, Jean Carlos Encarnacion, Brett Cumberland, Evan Phillips and international signing money were traded to the Baltimore Orioles in exchange for Kevin Gausman and Darren O'Day. He was assigned to the Double-A Bowie Baysox and finished the season there. In 25 starts between Rome, Mississippi, and Bowie, he compiled an 11–7 record with a 3.21 ERA. He returned to Bowie to begin 2019 before being promoted to the Triple-A Norfolk Tides in July. Over 25 games (24 starts) between the two clubs, Zimmermann pitched to a 7–6 record with a 3.21 ERA, striking out 134 over 140 innings.

His addition to the Orioles' 60-player Alternate Training Site pool was delayed to August 2020 due to his recovery from COVID-19. Hours after he was added to the team's 40-man roster when his contract was selected by the Orioles, Zimmermann pitched three innings as the starting pitcher in his MLB debut in a 10–6 loss to the Tampa Bay Rays in the second game of a two-night doubleheader at Camden Yards on September 17, 2020. Zimmermann gave up six earned runs over seven innings pitched in his debut season in 2020.

On August 15, 2021, Zimmermann was placed on the 60-day injured list. Zimmermann had been nearing a return to the team from biceps tendinitis but suffered a sprained right ankle. He was activated from the injured list on September 28. On the season, he went 4-5 with a 5.04 ERA and 56 strikeouts in 64 1/3 innings pitched across 14 games (13 starts).

In 2022, Zimmermann made 15 appearances (13 starts) for Baltimore. In 73 2/3 innings pitched, he recorded a 2-5 record with a 5.99 ERA and 49 strikeouts. On June 16, 2022, he was optioned to Norfolk after allowing six runs in 4 2/3 innings pitched against the Toronto Blue Jays.

Zimmermann was optioned to Triple-A Norfolk to begin the 2023 season. On June 13, 2023, while pitching for Norfolk, Zimmermann tossed a complete–game shutout against the Worcester Red Sox. He pitched in just seven games for Baltimore, logging a 4.73 ERA with 14 strikeouts in 13 1/3 innings of work. Following the season on October 19, Zimmermann underwent core muscle surgery.

Zimmermann was optioned to Triple–A Norfolk to begin the 2024 season. In 18 games (14 starts) for Norfolk, he compiled a 3–4 record and 4.64 ERA with 60 strikeouts across 66 innings. Zimmermann was designated for assignment on August 22, 2024. He cleared waivers and was sent outright to Norfolk on August 24. Zimmermann elected free agency following the season on November 4.

=== Milwaukee Brewers ===
On December 19, 2024, Zimmermann signed a minor league contract with the Milwaukee Brewers. In 19 appearances (13 starts) for the Triple-A Nashville Sounds, he logged a 6-5 record and 4.35 ERA with 69 strikeouts and two saves over 89 innings of work. On July 16, 2025, Zimmermann opted out of his contract and was released by the Brewers. He re-signed with the Brewers on a minor league contract on July 19. On September 20, the Brewers selected Zimmermann's contract, adding him to their active roster. He made one start for Milwaukee, taking the loss after allowing six runs (five earned) with one strikeout in six innings pitched against the San Diego Padres. On September 24, Zimmermann was designated for assignment by the Brewers. He cleared waivers and was sent outright to Nashville on September 27. Zimmermann elected free agency on October 3.

=== St. Louis Cardinals ===
On January 5, 2026, Zimmermann signed a minor league contract with the St. Louis Cardinals. In 15 starts for the Triple-A Memphis Redbirds, he compiled a 5–3 record and 3.78 ERA with 84 strikeouts across 78 2/3 innings pitched. On July 7, the Cardinals selected Zimmermann's contract, adding him to their active roster. He made his Cardinals debut that day and pitched five innings in relief versus the Milwaukee Brewers. That same day, the Cardinals designated Zimmermann for assignment. He cleared waivers and was sent outright to Triple-A Memphis on July 13. On July 15, Zimmermann elected free agency.

=== Hanwha Eagles ===
On July 19, 2026, Zimmermann signed a $300,000 contract with the Hanwha Eagles of the KBO League for the remainder of the 2026 season.
