= Darren O'Day =

American baseball player (born 1982)

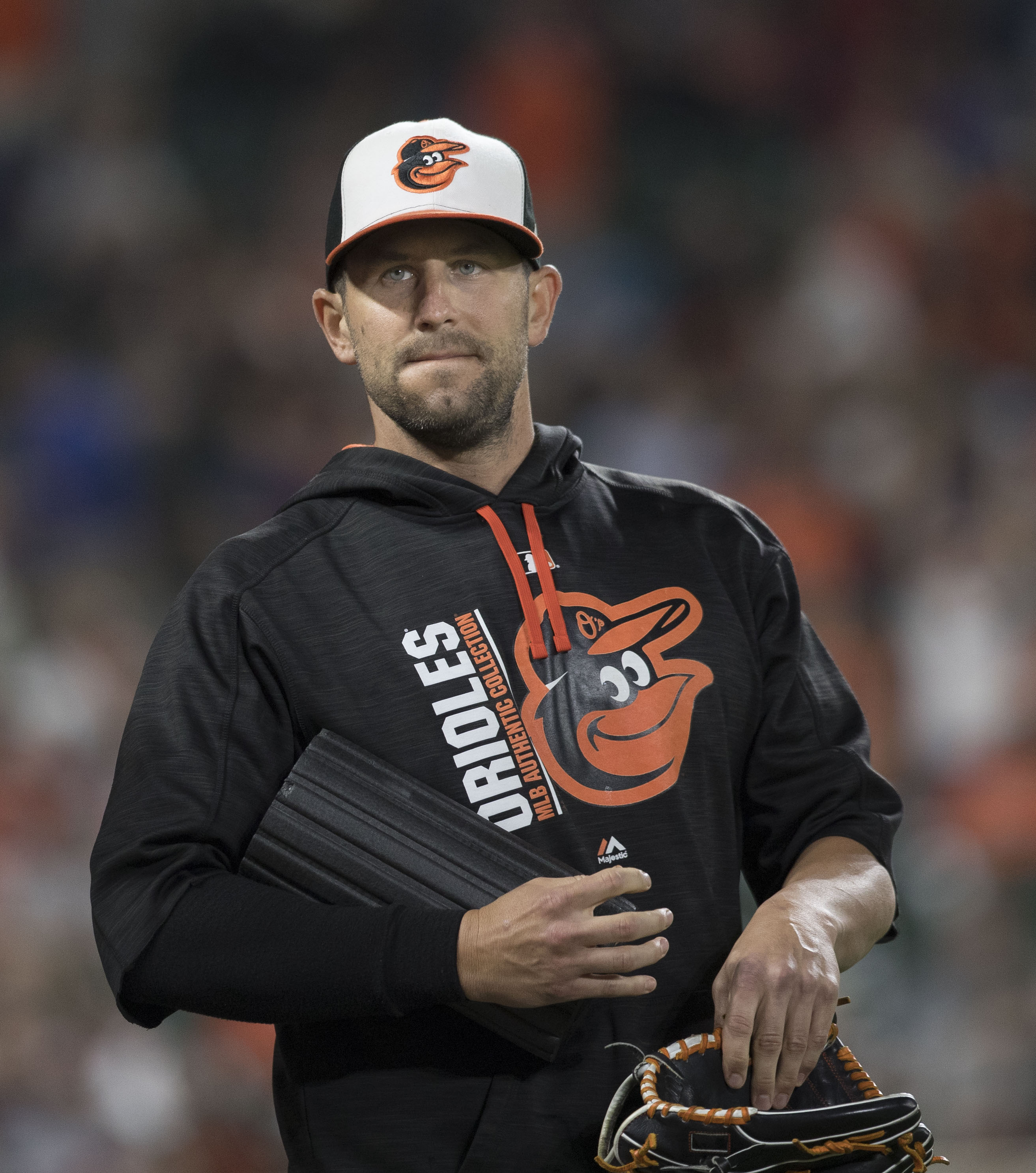
- O'Day with the Baltimore Orioles in 2017
- Pitcher
- Born: October 22, 1982 (age 44); Jacksonville, Florida, U.S.
- Batted: Right Threw: Right

MLB debut
- March 31, 2008, for the Los Angeles Angels of Anaheim

Last MLB appearance
- July 11, 2022, for the Atlanta Braves

MLB statistics
- Win–loss record: 42–21
- Earned run average: 2.59
- Strikeouts: 637
- Stats at Baseball Reference

Teams
- Los Angeles Angels of Anaheim (2008); New York Mets (2009); Texas Rangers (2009–2011); Baltimore Orioles (2012–2018); Atlanta Braves (2019–2020); New York Yankees (2021); Atlanta Braves (2022)

Career highlights and awards
- All-Star (2015)

Darren Christopher O'Day (born October 22, 1982) is an American former professional baseball pitcher and current broadcaster. He played in Major League Baseball (MLB) for the Los Angeles Angels of Anaheim, New York Mets, Texas Rangers, Baltimore Orioles, New York Yankees, and Atlanta Braves.

O'Day played college baseball for the University of Florida. Undrafted out of college, O'Day signed as a free agent with the Angels in 2006. He made his MLB debut in 2008, and was an All-Star in 2015. O'Day is one of the few major league pitchers to throw submarine pitches.

== Early life and amateur career ==
O'Day was born in Jacksonville, Florida. He attended Bishop Kenny High School in Jacksonville, and played high school baseball for the Bishop Kenny Crusaders.

O'Day accepted an athletic scholarship to attend the University of Florida in Gainesville, Florida, where he played for coach Pat McMahon's Florida Gators baseball team from 2003 to 2006. He earned Southeastern Conference (SEC) Academic Honor Roll recognition for four consecutive years, and was an Academic All-American as a senior. During the Gators' run in the 2005 College World Series, O'Day made four relief appearances and earned a save. O'Day graduated from the University of Florida with a bachelor's degree in agricultural and life sciences in 2006.

== Professional career ==
=== Los Angeles Angels of Anaheim ===
Undrafted out of college, O'Day signed as a free agent with the Los Angeles Angels of Anaheim in 2006. He made his major league debut with the Angels in 2008. In 30 games, he was 0–1 with a 4.57 ERA in 43 1/3 innings.

=== New York Mets ===
The New York Mets selected O'Day in the Rule 5 Draft on December 11, 2008. He made the Mets' roster out of spring training. He was widely quoted in the media on the death of his former teammate Nick Adenhart. He was designated for assignment by the Mets two weeks into the season in order to make room on the roster for Nelson Figueroa.

=== Texas Rangers ===
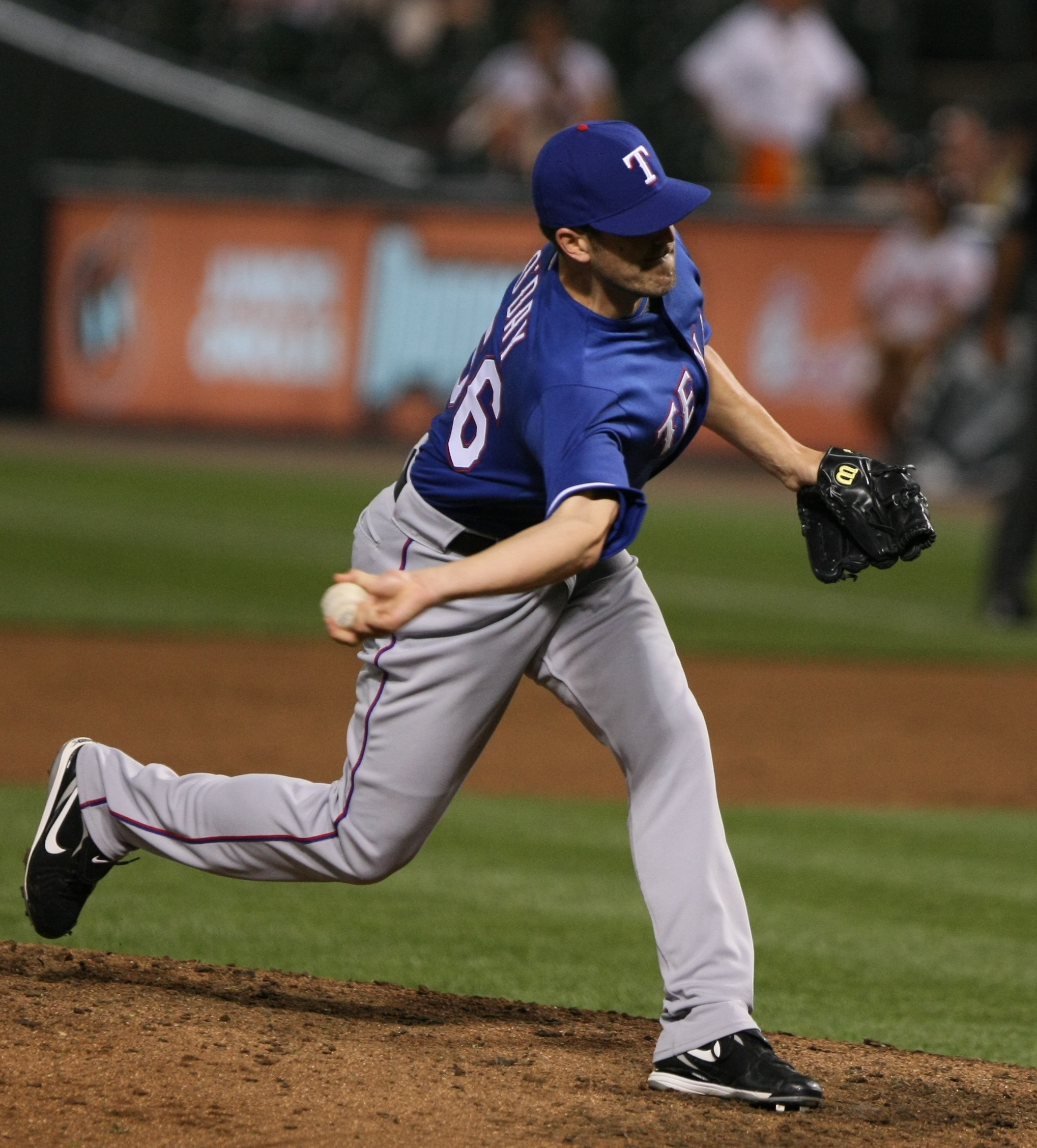
Darren O'Day throws a "submarine" side-arm pitch for the Texas Rangers in April 2009.

The Texas Rangers claimed him on April 22, 2009 and he made his debut the same day in extra innings against the Toronto Blue Jays, just minutes after getting to the bullpen from the airport. His arrival was so quick that he had to wear the jersey of Kason Gabbard in his first appearance. He was an effective reliever for the Rangers, posting an ERA of 1.94 in 64 games. He struck out 54 in 55 2/3 innings. The following season he appeared in a career high 72 games, posting an ERA of 2.03 with a 6–2 record.

Limited to sixteen appearances due to a pair of injuries, O'Day was 0–1 with a 5.40 earned run average (ERA) in 2011. He was first sidelined from April 27 to July 1 because of a partial acetabular labrum tear in his left hip. Right shoulder inflammation sent him back to the disabled list for the second time from August 25 to September 12. He also pitched in eighteen minor league games with the Frisco RoughRiders and Round Rock Express, going a combined 1–0 with a 2.53 ERA. He was not activated to the Rangers' roster for any round of that year's postseason.

During this period, when he arrived at the mound, Texas Rangers' fans began a traditional chant of his last name.

=== Baltimore Orioles ===
==== 2012 ====
The Baltimore Orioles claimed O'Day off waivers on November 2, 2011. He was scheduled to make $1.35 million in the 2012 season. Following the struggles of Pedro Strop, O'Day settled into the role of the 8th inning setup pitcher later in the 2012 season, often leaving the game in a manageable state for closer Jim Johnson. O'Day posted a 7–1 record with a 2.28 ERA by the end of the 2012 season.

==== 2013 ====
In 2013, O'Day continued his success as an Oriole, going 5–3 as their 8th inning setup man, while posting a 2.18 ERA in 68 games. He collected two saves and pitched 62.0 innings, while striking out 59 batters and holding opponents to a .210 batting average.

==== 2014 ====
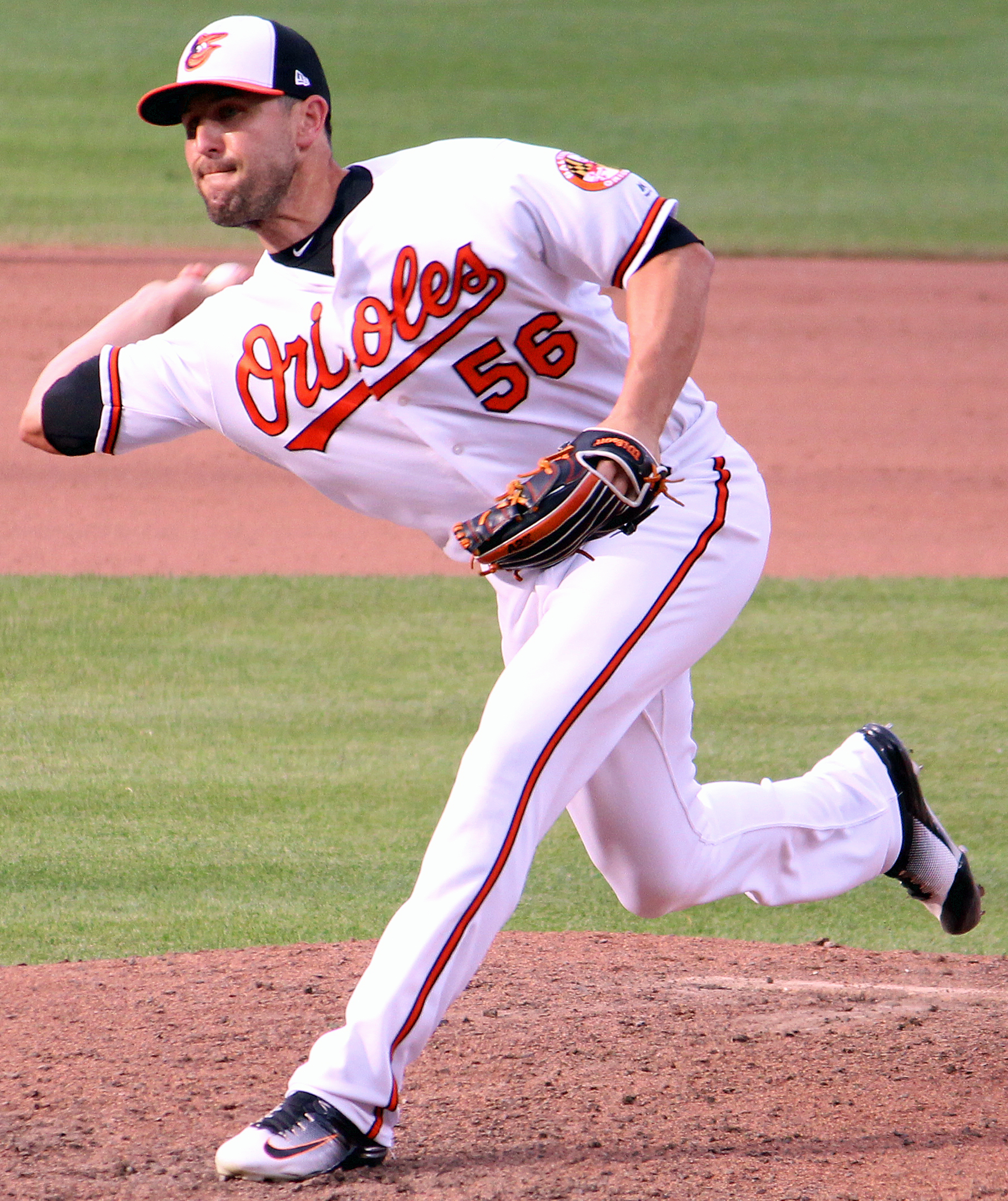
O'Day pitching in 2017

Former Orioles reliever and fellow submarine pitcher Todd Frohwirth worked with O'Day during spring training in 2014 to improve his change-up. O'Day had a career year in 2014, as he pitched 68 2/3 innings in 68 games and collected a 5–2 record with four saves. He posted a 1.70 ERA along with a 0.89 WHIP. He also struck out 73 batters and held opponents to a career-best .174 batting average. He set career-bests in innings pitched, saves, ERA, WHIP, strikeouts, and opponent batting average. Despite his most successful season, O'Day struggled greatly in the postseason, as he posted an 0–2 record and a 13.50 ERA in four games. Particularly in the 2014 American League Championship Series, O'Day went 0–2 in three games and posted a 16.20 ERA.

==== 2015 ====
In 2015, O'Day was selected to appear in the All-Star Game. He finished his career year with a 1.52 ERA in 68 appearances, which totaled to 65 1/3 innings. He compiled a 6–2 record and set a career-high with six saves. He also set a career-high with 82 strikeouts.

==== 2016 ====
On December 14, 2015, the Orioles re-signed O'Day to a 4-year, $31 million contract. Battling injuries throughout the duration of the season, O'Day had his worst year as an Oriole. He appeared in only 34 games, throwing 31 innings while pitching to a 3.77 ERA, his highest as a member of the Orioles. He compiled a 3–1 record and struck out 38 batters. O'Day also appeared in the Wild Card Game for the Orioles, tossing 1 2/3 innings while striking out one batter in a 5–2 loss.

==== 2017 ====
O'Day rebounded from the previous season, registering a healthy season in which he appeared in 64 games. He also had an ERA of 3.43 in 60 1/3 innings.

==== 2018 ====
O'Day appeared in 20 games for the O's before undergoing season ending surgery on his left hamstring.

=== Atlanta Braves ===
On July 31, 2018, O'Day, along with Kevin Gausman, were traded to the Atlanta Braves in exchange for Brett Cumberland, Jean Carlos Encarnacion, Evan Phillips, Bruce Zimmermann, and international signing money.

O'Day opened the 2019 season on the injured list with a right forearm injury, which followed a single spring training appearance. He was activated to the major league roster on September 5. In 2019 he was 0–0 with a 1.69 ERA in 5.1 innings over 8 games.

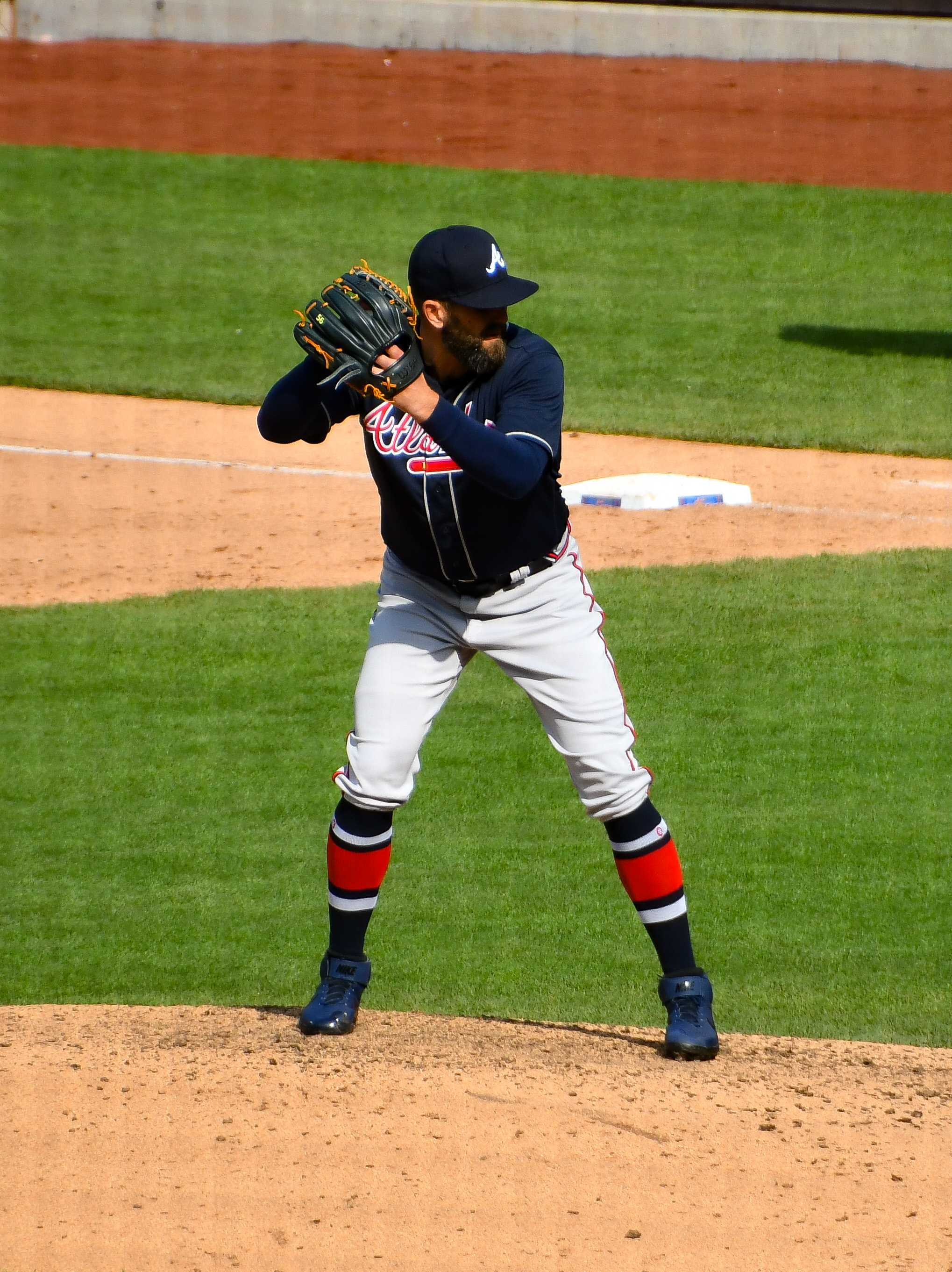
O'Day with the Atlanta Braves in 2022

On November 8, 2019, O'Day re–signed with the Braves on a one-year, $2.5 million contract, with a club option for a second year.

After finishing the 2020 season 4–0 with a 1.10 ERA and 22 strikeouts over 16.1 innings (19 relief appearances total), the Braves declined their $3.5 million club option on his contract for the following season, opting to pay his $500,000 buyout, and he became a free agent.

=== New York Yankees ===
O'Day signed a one-year, $1.75 million contract with the New York Yankees on February 10, 2021. On May 1, O'Day was placed on the injured list with a right rotator cuff strain, and was activated on June 29 after a near two-month stay on the IL. On July 7, O'Day was placed on the injured list with a “significant” left hamstring strain. On July 18, Yankees manager Aaron Boone stated that O'Day would likely miss the remainder of the season. On July 20, it was announced O’Day would undergo left hamstring surgery, ending his 2021 season. In 12 appearances with the Yankees, O'Day recorded a 3.38 ERA with 11 strikeouts. He became a free agent after the season.

=== Atlanta Braves (second stint) ===
On November 29, 2021, O'Day signed a minor league contract to return to the Atlanta Braves. On April 3, 2022, O’Day was selected to the Opening Day roster. In July, O'Day strained his left calf muscle and was placed on the injured list. While rehabilitating the injury in the minor leagues, O'Day sprained his right big toe and was transferred to the 60-day IL in September. He announced his retirement as an active player on January 30, 2023.

== Personal life ==
O'Day's original family name was Odachowski. His paternal grandmother, who had raised his father Ralph and two uncles on her own after his grandfather died in a car accident, shortened it to Odach (the "ch" is silent in Polish phonology) to make it easier to pronounce for her colleagues at Montgomery Ward in Chicago. Ralph and one of his brothers legally changed their last names to O'Day in her honor after they were married. O'Day had "D. Odachowski" stitched on the side of his game glove to honor his family history. "Odachowski" was featured on the back of his jersey worn during MLB's Players Weekend on August 25–27, 2017.

O'Day is married to Elizabeth Prann, a University of Florida alumna and an anchor/reporter for HLN. Their first child, a daughter named Claire, was born in December 2014.

In 2017, O'Day was honored as the 2017 Major League Baseball recipient of the Bob Feller Act of Valor Award for his work with the United States Military.

His parents are Ralph Leon and Michal (nee Shoemaker) O'Day, and he has an older brother, Kyle Matthew O'Day. He is a descendant of Louis Du Bois, an early settler of Ulster County, New York and New Paltz, New York, as well as the Hasbrouck family. Through these relations, his 11th cousin is Zack Short of the New York Mets organization.

== See also ==
- List of Florida Gators baseball players
- List of people from Jacksonville, Florida
- List of University of Florida alumni
- Rule 5 draft results
