= Evan Phillips =

American baseball player (born 1994)

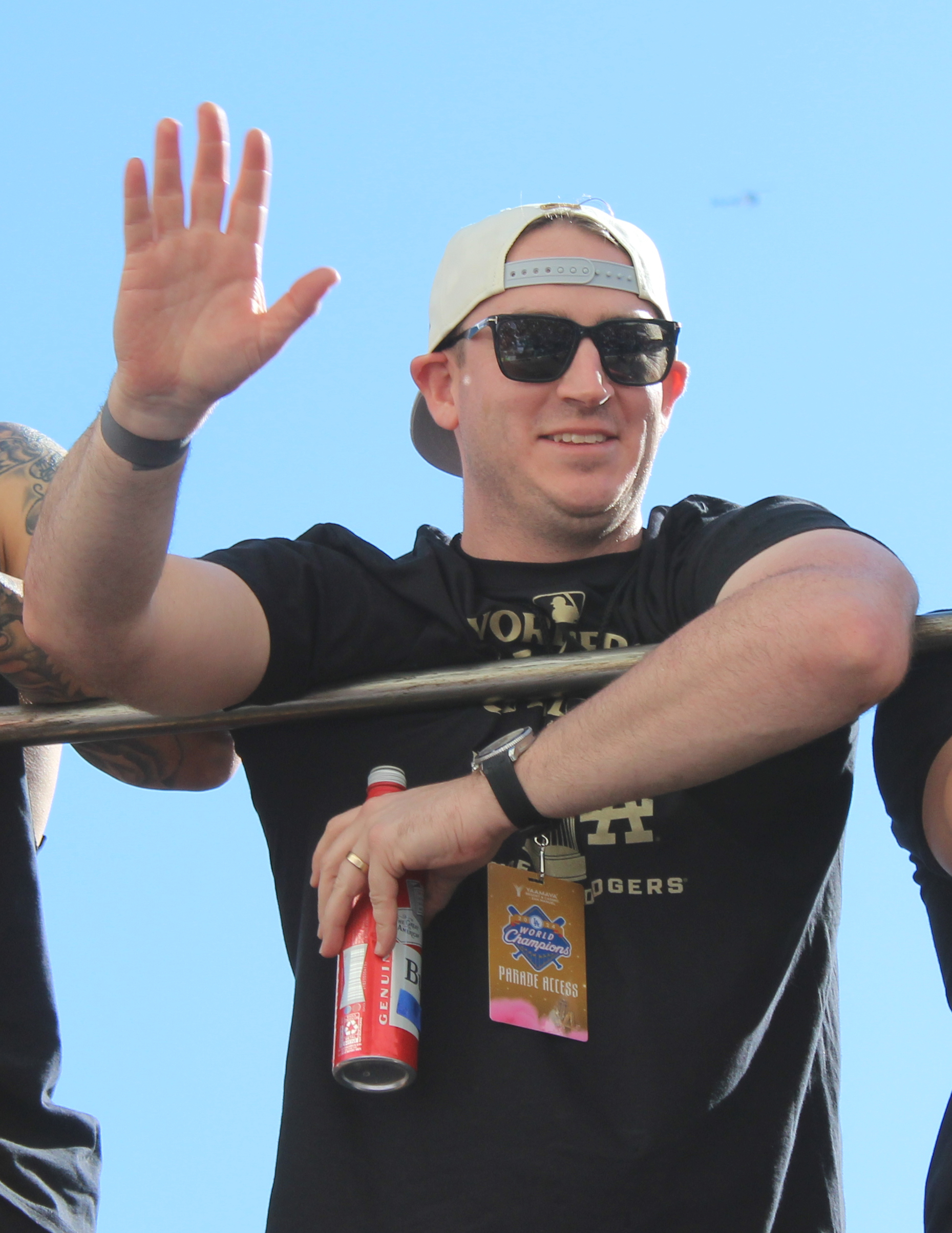
- Phillips at the 2024 championship parade

Atlanta Braves
- Pitcher
- Born: September 11, 1994 (age 32); Salisbury, Maryland, U.S.
- Bats: Right Throws: Right

MLB debut
- July 3, 2018, for the Atlanta Braves

MLB statistics (through 2026 season)
- Win–loss record: 19–14
- Earned run average: 3.37
- Strikeouts: 324
- Saves: 47
- Stats at Baseball Reference

Teams
- Atlanta Braves (2018); Baltimore Orioles (2018–2020); Tampa Bay Rays (2021); Los Angeles Dodgers (2021–2026)

Evan John Phillips (born September 11, 1994) is an American professional baseball pitcher for the Atlanta Braves of Major League Baseball (MLB). He has previously played in MLB for the Baltimore Orioles, Tampa Bay Rays, and Los Angeles Dodgers.

== Career ==
=== Amateur career ===
Phillips attended Clayton High School in Clayton, North Carolina, and was drafted by the Kansas City Royals in the 33rd round of the 2012 Major League Baseball draft, but did not sign. He attended the University of North Carolina at Wilmington and played college baseball for the UNC Wilmington Seahawks. In 37 college appearances, he was 6–6 with a 5.07 ERA.

=== Atlanta Braves ===
The Atlanta Braves selected Phillips in the 17th round of the 2015 Major League Baseball draft and he spent his first professional season with the Danville Braves and Rome Braves, going a combined 2-3 with a 2.73 ERA in 29 2/3 total relief innings pitched. In 2016, he pitched for the Carolina Mudcats and Mississippi Braves, pitching to a combined 8-4 record and 3.02 ERA in 43 relief appearances between both teams, and after the season played in the Arizona Fall League for the Salt River Rafters. Phillips played 2017 with Mississippi and the Gwinnett Braves, going a combined 3-4 with a 6.14 ERA in 51.1 total innings pitched, and started 2018 with Gwinnett Stripers.

Phillips was called up by the Braves on June 23, 2018. He returned to the Stripers on June 25, without making a major league appearance. He was recalled on July 2 and made his major league debut the next day. In his debut he pitched 2 1/3 innings, striking out Kyle Higashioka but yielding a home run. In the Braves organization in 2018, he pitched in 31 games for Gwinnett to a 1.99 ERA in 40 2/3 innings and in four games for Atlanta, allowing six runs in 6 1/3 innings.

=== Baltimore Orioles ===
On July 31, 2018, the Braves traded Phillips, Jean Carlos Encarnacion, Brett Cumberland, Bruce Zimmermann and international signing money to the Baltimore Orioles in exchange for Kevin Gausman and Darren O'Day. He made five appearances for the Orioles in 2018, allowing 11 earned runs in only 5 1/3 innings and eight appearances for the Triple-A Norfolk Tides, where he allowed four runs in 10 1/3 innings.

Phillips split 2019 between Norfolk and Baltimore, appearing in 25 games for the Orioles (20 runs in 28 innings) and 27 games for the Tides (17 runs in 39 2/3 innings. In the pandemic shortened 2020 season, Phillips pitched to a 5.02 ERA and 20 strikeouts over 14 1/3 innings pitched in 14 games. On September 30th, he was outrighted off of the 40-man roster but remained with Norfolk.

In 2021, Phillips made 18 appearances for the Tides and had a 5.04 ERA with 35 strikeouts. On August 2, he was released by the Orioles.

=== Tampa Bay Rays ===
On August 3, 2021, Phillips signed a minor league deal with the Tampa Bay Rays and on August 12, he was called up to the majors. He made his Rays debut on August 13, pitching three innings and giving up one run, while earning his first career save. The following day, he was designated for assignment.

=== Los Angeles Dodgers ===
On August 16, 2021, the Los Angeles Dodgers claimed Phillips off of waivers. He made his debut for the Dodgers three days later, pitching 2 1/3 innings in relief against the New York Mets and getting his first win as a Dodger. He pitched in a total of seven games for the Dodgers in 2021, allowing four earned runs in 10 1/3 innings. He also pitched three scoreless innings over two games in the 2021 NLCS against the Atlanta Braves, allowing only one hit and two walks while striking out six.

In 2022, Phillips pitched in a team-high 64 games and had a 7–3 record and 1.14 ERA with 77 strikeouts during the season and pitched 3 1/3 scoreless innings in the 2022 NLDS. He became the Dodgers closer in 2023 and recorded 24 saves in 61 1/3 innings over 62 games while posting a 2.05 ERA with 66 strikeouts. Phillips also pitched 2 1/3 scoreless innings in the 2023 NLDS.

Phillips and the Dodgers agreed to a $4 million salary for 2024 in salary arbitration. In 2024, Phillips pitched in 61 games and had a 5–1 record and 3.43 ERA with 63 strikeouts and 18 saves. In the postseason, Phillips pitched 6 2/3 scoreless innings with six strikeouts across the NLDS and NLCS but suffered an arm injury in the final game of the NLCS, causing him to be left off the 2024 World Series roster. Recovery from the injury also caused him to miss the start of the 2025 season. Phillips made seven scoreless appearances for Los Angeles in 2025, recording six strikeouts and one save across 5 2/3 innings. On May 30, 2025, it was announced that he would miss the remainder of the season due to Tommy John surgery. On November 21, the Dodgers did not tender Phillips a contract for 2026, making him a free agent.

On February 11, 2026, Phillips re-signed with the Dodgers on a one-year, $6.5 million contract. He began the season on the 60-day injured list and was activated on July 6. In 31 games for the Dodgers in 2026, Phillips pitched 26 innings with a 3.46 ERA and 33 strikeouts.

=== Atlanta Braves (second stint) ===
On November 12, 2026, Phillips signed a three-year, $35 million contract with the Atlanta Braves.

== Personal life ==
Phillips' father, Joe played baseball at Anne Arundel Community College. In April 2023, Phillips and his wife Elizabeth had their first child, a son.
