= Brett Cumberland =

American baseball player (born 1995)

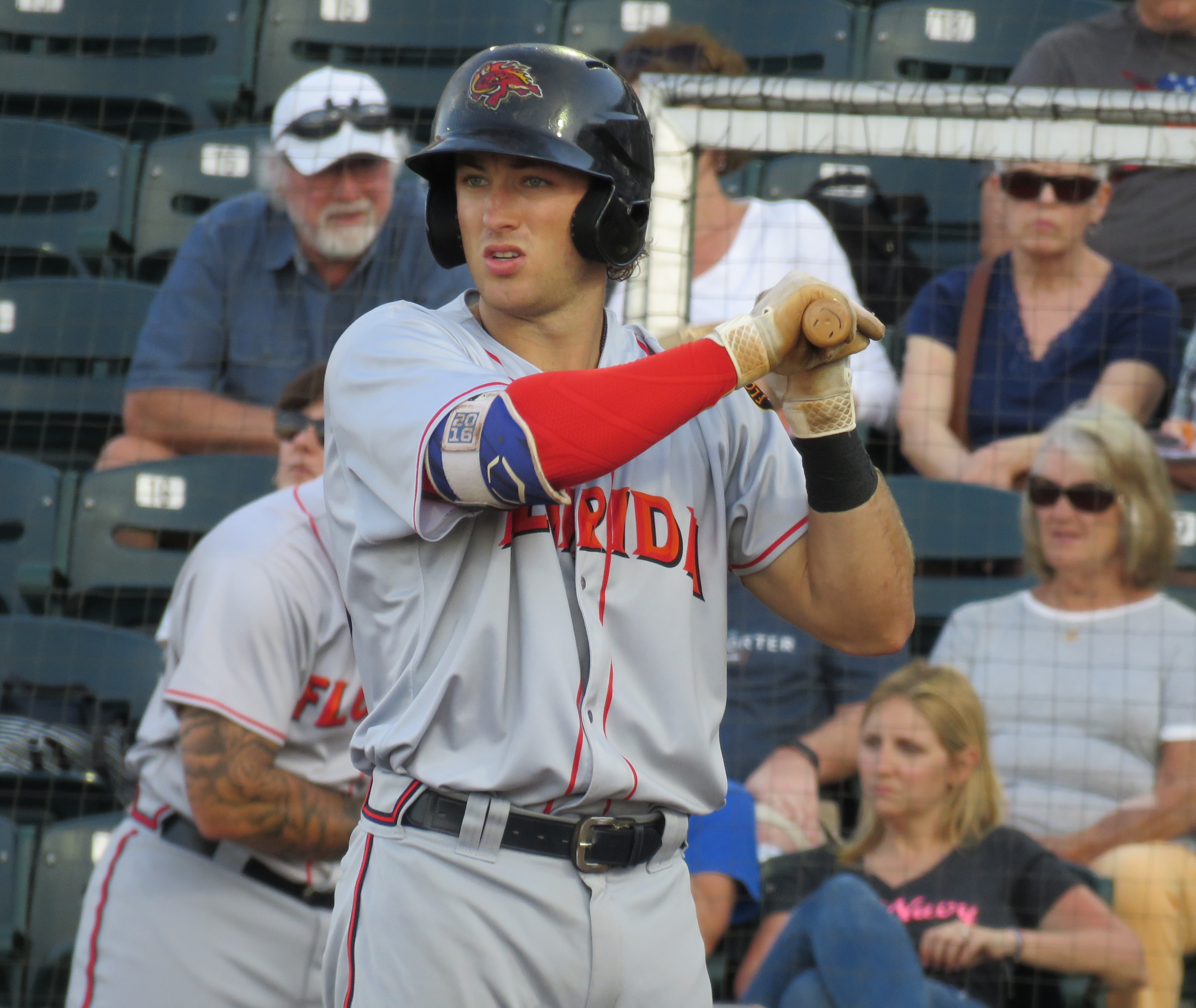
- Cumberland with the Florida Fire Frogs in 2018
- Catcher
- Born: June 25, 1995 (age 29); Turlock, California, U.S.
- Bats: Switch Throws: Right

Matthew Brett Cumberland (born June 25, 1995) is an American former professional baseball catcher.

== Career ==
Cumberland attended Turlock High School in Turlock, California. In 2014, The Modesto Bee named Cumberland their All-District Player of the Year. He enrolled at the University of California, Berkeley, where he played college baseball for the California Golden Bears. He became California's starting catcher in his freshman year. In 2016, Cumberland was named the Pac-12 Conference's Baseball Player of the Year. He was named as a finalist for the Golden Spikes Award.

=== Atlanta Braves ===
The Atlanta Braves selected Cumberland in the second round, with the 76th overall selection, of the 2016 Major League Baseball draft. He signed with Atlanta and was assigned to the Danville Braves, where he spent the whole season, posting a .216 batting average with three home runs and 30 RBIs in 45 games. He began the 2017 season with the Rome Braves, and after batting .263 with ten home runs and 48 RBIs in 55 games, was promoted to the Florida Fire Frogs where he finished the season with a .269 batting average one home run and 21 RBIs in 56 games. He began 2018 with the Fire Frogs before being promoted to the Mississippi Braves in July.

=== Baltimore Orioles ===
On July 31, 2018, the Braves traded Cumberland, Jean Carlos Encarnacion, Evan Phillips, and Bruce Zimmermann to the Baltimore Orioles in exchange for Kevin Gausman and Darren O'Day. He was assigned to the Double-A Bowie Baysox and finished the season there. In 102 games between Florida, Mississippi, and Bowie, he batted .224 with 14 home runs and 46 RBI. In 2019, he returned to Bowie, but missed time during the season due to injury; he ultimately played in 41 games, batting .248 with four home runs and twenty RBI. Cumberland did not play in a game in 2020 due to the cancellation of the minor league season because of the COVID-19 pandemic.

Cumberland spent the 2021 season with the Triple-A Norfolk Tides, playing in 84 games and batting .187/.352/.330 with 10 home runs and 23 RBI. He split the 2022 campaign between the rookie-level Florida Complex League Orioles, High-A Aberdeen IronBirds, and Norfolk. In 47 games for the three affiliates, Cumberland slashed .230/.346/.336 with four home runs and 22 RBI. He elected free agency following the season on November 10, 2022.

=== San Francisco Giants ===
On December 22, 2022, Cumberland signed a minor league contract with the San Francisco Giants. He played in only one game for the rookie–level Arizona Complex League Giants, and elected free agency following the season on November 6, 2023.

On May 5, 2024, Cumberland announced his retirement from professional baseball.
