= Kevin Gausman =

American baseball player (born 1991)

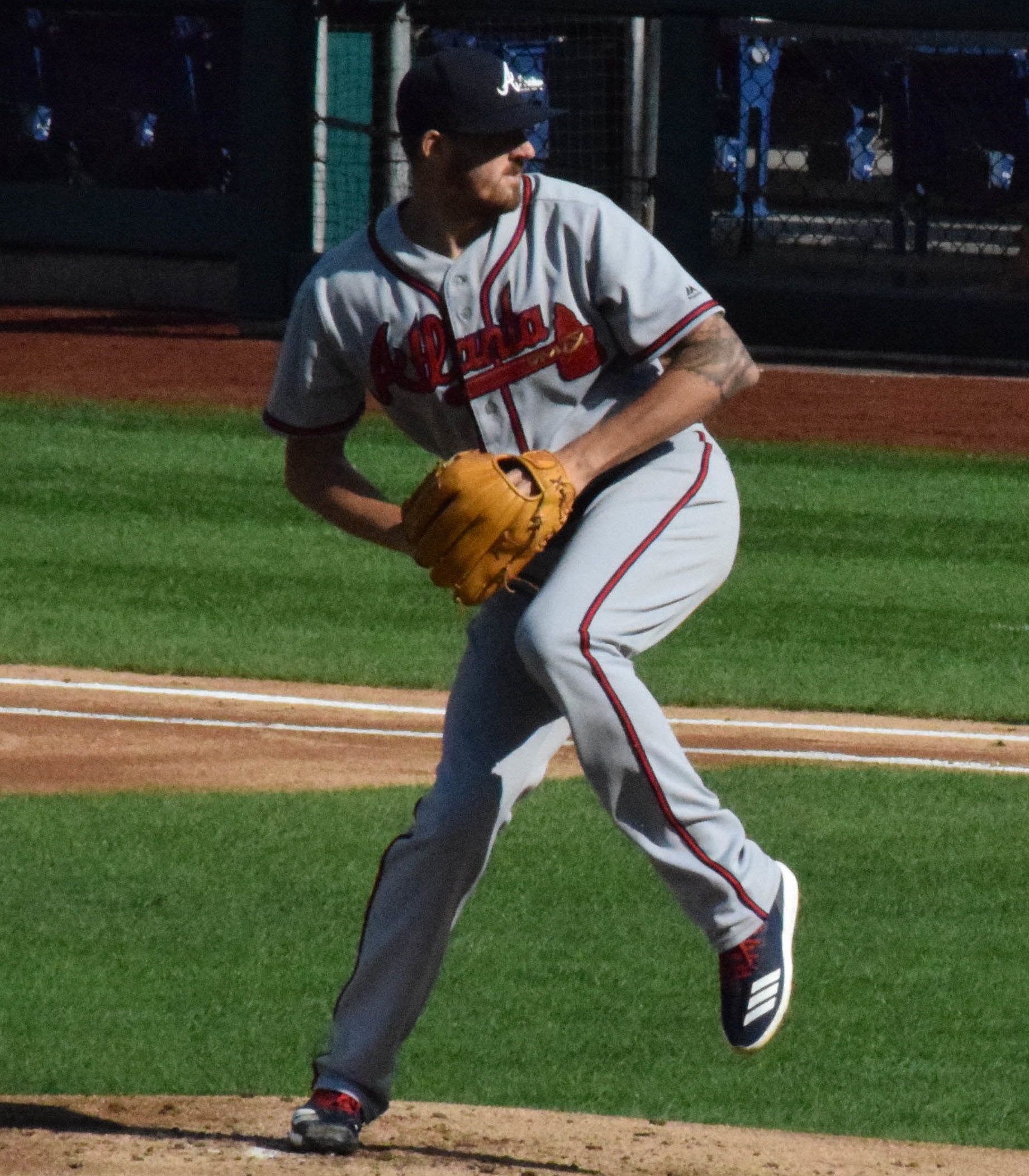
- Gausman with the Atlanta Braves in 2018

Free agent
- Pitcher
- Born: January 6, 1991 (age 35); Centennial, Colorado, U.S.
- Bats: Left Throws: Right

MLB debut
- May 23, 2013, for the Baltimore Orioles

MLB statistics (through 2026 season)
- Win–loss record: 121–125
- Earned run average: 3.87
- Strikeouts: 2,138
- Stats at Baseball Reference

Teams
- Baltimore Orioles (2013–2018); Atlanta Braves (2018–2019); Cincinnati Reds (2019); San Francisco Giants (2020–2021); Toronto Blue Jays (2022–2026); Chicago Cubs (2026)

Career highlights and awards
- 2× All-Star (2021, 2023); AL strikeout leader (2023)

Kevin John Gausman (born January 6, 1991) is an American professional baseball pitcher who is a free agent. He has played in Major League Baseball (MLB) for the Baltimore Orioles, Atlanta Braves, Cincinnati Reds, San Francisco Giants, Toronto Blue Jays, and Chicago Cubs.

Gausman played college baseball for the LSU Tigers, with whom he was an All-American. He was selected by the Orioles in the first round (4th overall) of the 2012 MLB draft and made his MLB debut in 2013. He was an All-Star in 2021 and 2023 and led the American League in strikeouts in 2023.

== Early life ==
Gausman attended Grandview High School in Aurora, Colorado, where he played for the school's baseball team as a pitcher. In his sophomore year he pitched to a 5–2 win–loss record with a 2.79 earned run average (ERA). In his junior year, he was 7–2 with a 2.15 ERA, and in 2010, his senior year, he was 9–2 with a 3.12 ERA. As a batter, playing for his high school varsity, he hit .322/.431/.576 with seven home runs and 40 runs batted in (RBIs) in 145 plate appearances.

The Los Angeles Dodgers selected Gausman in the sixth round of the 2010 Major League Baseball draft, but he did not sign.

== College career ==
Gausman attended Louisiana State University (LSU), where he played college baseball for the LSU Tigers baseball team. In 2011, he played collegiate summer baseball with the Harwich Mariners of the Cape Cod Baseball League. In 2012, as a sophomore at LSU, he was 12–2 (leading the Southeastern Conference in wins) with a 2.77 ERA in 18 games (17 starts) and 135 strikeouts (leading the conference) in 123 2/3 innings. He was named an All-American in 2012.

Gausman pitched in both Games 1 and 2 of the Baton Rouge Super Regional, coming out in relief in the completion of the rain-delayed first game and earning a win, but taking a loss in the second game as LSU suffered a historic upset loss to Stony Brook. In an interview with Jake Arrieta ten years later, Gausman said, "That's probably the one thing in baseball that I constantly look back on."

== Professional career ==
=== Baltimore Orioles (2013–2018) ===
==== Draft and MLB debut (2012–2013) ====
The Baltimore Orioles selected Gausman in the first round with the fourth overall selection in the 2012 Major League Baseball draft. He signed with the Orioles for a signing bonus of $4.32 million on July 13, 2012.

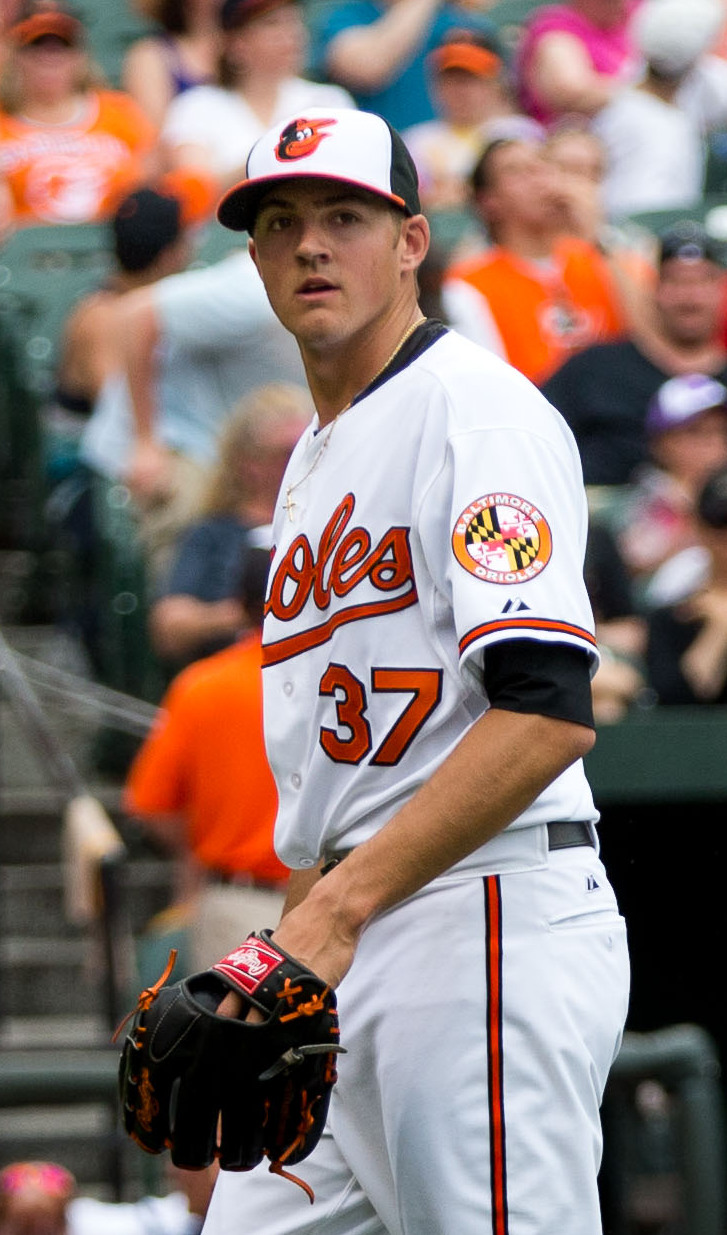
Gausman in 2013

Gausman started the 2013 season with the Double-A Bowie Baysox. The Orioles promoted Gausman to the major leagues to make his debut in Toronto against the Blue Jays on May 23. He pitched five innings and allowed seven hits, four runs, and two walks, while striking out five. He picked up the loss as the Orioles fell 12–6 to the Blue Jays. On June 14, Gausman was optioned to the Triple-A Norfolk Tides. He was recalled again on June 24, and on June 28 he earned his first Major League win, against the New York Yankees, pitching in relief of T. J. McFarland, going 4 1/3 innings, striking out four and allowing no walks and three hits. Gausman was optioned back to Norfolk on July 10. He was again recalled from Norfolk on August 28 and earned his second big league win, on September 1, also against the Yankees, this time at Yankee Stadium.

==== 2014–2015 ====
On June 7, 2014, Gausman earned his first win as a starting pitcher, going seven innings against the Oakland Athletics, allowing only one run, walking one, and striking out six. Following the best outing of his young career, Gausman pitched against the American League (AL) East leading Toronto Blue Jays where he went six innings, again allowing one run and striking out three. In the 2014 postseason, Gausman pitched out of the bullpen for the Orioles. Gausman pitched eight innings in three relief appearances, posting a 1.13 ERA and an 0.75 WHIP. The Orioles would sweep the Tigers in the AL Division Series (ALDS) before being swept in the AL Championship Series (ALCS) by the Kansas City Royals. Gausman finished the 2014 campaign having made 20 starts, with one complete game (five innings, due to rain), posting a 3.57 ERA and a 7–7 win–loss record.

Gausman made 25 appearances in 2015 (17 starts). He posted a moderate 4.25 ERA, but struck out a career-high 103 batters, averaging 8.3 strikeouts per nine innings pitched (K/9). He posted a 4–7 record, as the Orioles finished 81–81 and didn't make the playoffs.

==== 2016 season ====
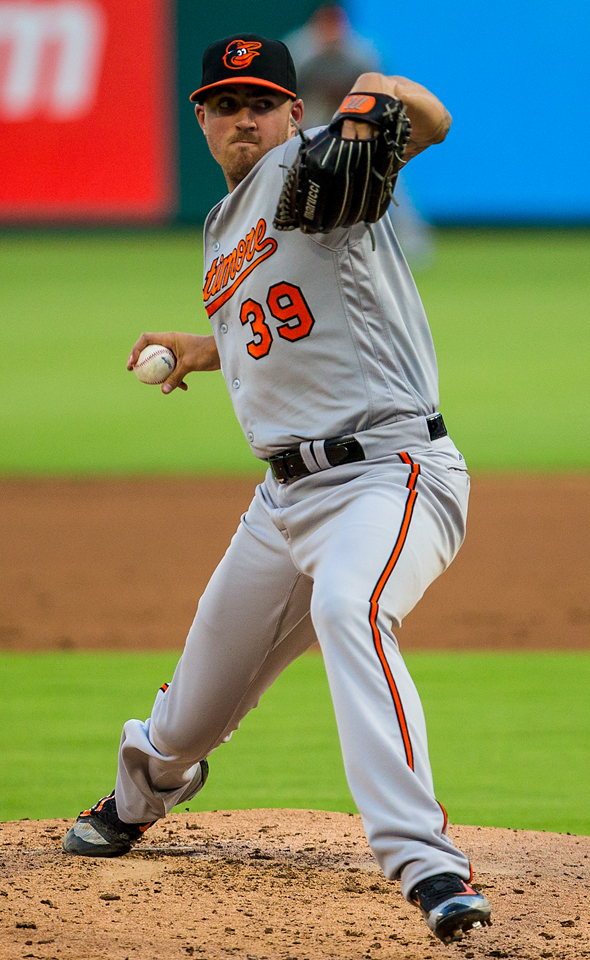
Gausman pitching for the Orioles in 2016

Gausman started the 2016 season on the disabled list. He made his season debut on April 25 against the Tampa Bay Rays, earning a loss after going five innings and giving up one run on three hits. He earned a no decision in his next start, as the Orioles lost 8–7 against the White Sox. Gausman went six innings, allowing three runs (two earned). His next start was the best of his career, as he pitched eight shutout innings, allowing only three hits along with no walks and four strikeouts. He earned a no decision, though, as the Orioles eventually won the game 1–0 in the tenth inning.

Gausman pitched to a 4.15 ERA and 1–6 record in 15 pre-All Star Break starts.

On August 28, Gausman pitched seven scoreless innings against the Yankees. In his next start against the Yankees, Gausman pitched six shutout innings, raising his scoreless innings streak to 19 2/3 innings. He struck out eight batters and won his career-high fourth straight start. Gausman also tied his career high with his seventh win of the year, while lowering his ERA to 3.58. He extended the scoreless innings streak to 21 1/3 against the Tigers before allowing a run in the second inning of a 4–3 loss. Following this start, he threw eight scoreless innings in a 1–0 victory over the Red Sox, improving to 8–10 on the year and lowering his ERA to 3.43.

Gausman finished the year 11–12, despite pitching to a 3.61 ERA, due to low run support. He struck out 174 batters in 179 2/3 innings. His 8.716 K/9 and his 3.706 strikeout-to-walk ratio were both 10th in the AL.

==== 2017–2018 ====
On March 28, 2017, Gausman was named the Orioles' Opening Day starting pitcher. He pitched 5 1/3 innings on Opening Day, allowing two runs on five hits and four walks, while also striking out four batters. Gausman earned a no decision. On May 3, Gausman was ejected for the first time in his major league career after hitting Xander Bogaerts with a pitch. On July 29, Gausman pitched the longest outing of his career so far, going 8 2/3 shutout innings against the Texas Rangers while striking out eight batters and earning the victory.

For the season, he led the league with 34 starts, and his 179 strikeouts and 186 2/3 innings pitched were both 10th in the AL. He had the lowest percentage of balls pulled against him (33.3%) among major league pitchers. His 8.630 K/9 was 10th in the AL.

Before the 2018 season, Gausman changed from his old number of 39 to 34, in honor of the late former Toronto Blue Jays and Philadelphia Phillies pitcher, and fellow Coloradan Roy Halladay. On April 23, in a start against the Cleveland Indians, Gausman threw the 90th immaculate inning in MLB history, striking out three batters in one inning on just nine pitches. He was the third Orioles pitcher to throw an immaculate inning and the first since B.J. Ryan in 1999, who also accomplished the feat against Cleveland.

=== Atlanta Braves (2018–2019) ===
On July 31, 2018, Gausman along with Darren O'Day, was traded to the Atlanta Braves in exchange for minor leaguers Brett Cumberland, Jean Carlos Encarnacion, Evan Phillips, Bruce Zimmermann, and international signing money.

During spring training in 2019, Gausman dealt with a sore shoulder. He began the season rehabilitating in the minor leagues, and made his season debut on April 5.

On May 3, 2019, Gausman was ejected from a game against the Miami Marlins by umpire Jeff Nelson for throwing behind José Ureña. He and Ureña had last faced each other on August 15, 2018, when Ureña hit the Braves' Ronald Acuña with a pitch. MLB fined and suspended Gausman for five games. Gausman initially appealed the suspension. On May 12, Gausman dropped his appeal. In 16 starts, he was 3–7 with a career-high 6.19 ERA and struck out 85 batters in 80 innings.

In August, Gausman was designated for assignment by the Braves following a stretch in which he allowed 47 hits and 29 earned runs over 26 innings.

=== Cincinnati Reds (2019) ===
On August 5, 2019, the Cincinnati Reds claimed Gausman off waivers from the Braves. With the Reds, Gausman became a reliever. He struck out all six St. Louis Cardinals batters he faced on August 18, including tossing his second career immaculate inning.

With Cincinnati in 2019, Gausman was 0–2 with a 4.03 ERA in 15 games (one start) in which he threw 22 1/3 innings, walked five batters, and struck out 29 batters. Cincinnati non-tendered him on December 2, making him a free agent.

=== San Francisco Giants (2020–2021) ===
On December 10, 2019, Gausman signed a one-year, $9 million contract with the San Francisco Giants.

During the shortened 2020 season, Gausman had a bounce-back season, going 3–3 with a 3.62 ERA, 15 walks, and 79 strikeouts in 59 2/3 innings in 12 games (10 starts), and a career-low 1.106 WHIP along with a career-high 11.9 K/9. On November 11, 2020, Gausman accepted a qualifying $18.9 million offer from the Giants.

Gausman was the Opening Day starter for the Giants in 2021. He was named the National League (NL) Pitcher of the Month for May. He won five games during the month, maintained an ERA of 0.73, and allowed an opponent slash line of .165/.201/.241. He was an NL All Star.

On September 17, Gausman was on the bench as the Giants took on the Braves. When the Giants ran out of position players, having already pinch hit five times, Gausman, slashing .184/.212/.184 as a batter, was called upon to pinch hit in the bottom of the 11th inning with the bases loaded and one out, and the game tied 5–5. On a full count, he hit his first career sacrifice fly, scoring Brandon Crawford to win the game. Gausman described it as "the coolest thing I've ever done in my entire career".

In the regular season, Gausman was 14–6 with a 2.81 ERA (6th in the NL). In a NL-leading 33 starts, he pitched 192 innings (5th) and had 227 strikeouts (4th). His 14 wins and 10.641 K/9 were fifth in the league, and he was sixth with a .700 win-loss percentage and 7.031 hits per nine innings. Gausman started Game 2 of the NL Division Series and came in relief in Game 5 of the series, both of which the Giants lost to the Los Angeles Dodgers.

=== Toronto Blue Jays (2022–2026) ===
On December 1, 2021, Gausman signed a five-year, $110 million contract with the Toronto Blue Jays. In 2022, Gausman made 31 starts during the regular season with a 12–10 record, 3.35 ERA, and 205 strikeouts. He started Game 2 of the Wild Card Series, allowing 4 runs in 5 2/3 innings in a loss to the Seattle Mariners.

In 2023, Gausman had a 3.16 ERA over 185 innings and an AL-best 237 strikeouts. He finished third in ALCy Young Award voting. He lost Game 1 of the AL Wild Card Series, allowing 3 runs in 4 innings against the Minnesota Twins.

In 2024, Gausman made 31 starts with a 14–11 record and a 3.83 ERA with 162 strikeouts.

On September 11, 2025 against the Houston Astros, Gausman pitched a complete game, allowing two hits and walking just one batter, while striking out nine batters in a 6–0 victory. It was Gausman's fourth career complete game and second career shutout. He finished the regular season with a 10–11 record, 3.59 ERA, and 189 strikeouts in 193 innings pitched. He made five postseason starts, going 2–3 with a 2.93 ERA as Toronto lost in the World Series.

Gausman was the Blue Jays' Opening Day starter in 2026. On May 11, he struck out Hunter Feduccia, his 2,000th career strikeout, in a game against Tampa Bay.

=== Chicago Cubs (2026–present) ===
On August 2, 2026, the Blue Jays traded Gausman to the Chicago Cubs in exchange for Brett Bateman and Ty Southisene. On August 7, Gausman made his first start with the Cubs, he went seven innings, allowing only two runs, and had four strikeouts in a win over the Kansas City Royals.

== Pitching style ==
Gausman currently throws three pitches regularly, according to Statcast: a four-seam fastball that averages at 94.6 miles per hour (152.2 km/h), a splitter at 84–86 mph (135–138 km/h), and a slider at 80–84 mph (129–135 km/h). He has occasionally thrown a sinker and changeup.

In 2020, Gausman increased the average velocity and spin rate (as compared to 2019) on his four-seam fastball by bending his right leg, while tucking the front foot at the level of the back leg's knee.

== Personal life ==
Gausman married his wife in December 2016. They have two daughters.

Gausman grew up a Colorado Rockies fan. His father has worked as a high school and college football referee and replay official, and his mother is a nurse.

== See also ==
- List of Major League Baseball annual shutout leaders
- List of Major League Baseball annual strikeout leaders
- List of Major League Baseball pitchers who have beaten all 30 teams
- List of Major League Baseball pitchers who have thrown an immaculate inning
- List of World Series starting pitchers
- Toronto Blue Jays award winners and league leaders
