= Geoff Loomis =

American baseball player & coach

Current position
- Title: Head coach
- Team: Portland
- Conference: West Coast
- Record: 233–260–1

Biographical details
- Born: December 22, 1970 (age 55); Oregon City, Oregon, U.S.

Playing career
- 1990–1992: Portland
- 1992–1993: Southern Oregon A's
- Position: Infielder

Coaching career (HC unless noted)
- 1996–2000: George Fox (asst.)
- 2003–2015: Pacific Lutheran
- 2016–present: Portland

Head coaching record
- Overall: 558–457–3
- Tournaments: WCC: 5–7; NCAA: 5–4

Accomplishments and honors

Championships
- 3× Northwest Conference (2007, 2009, 2015)

Awards
- Pac-10 Player of the Year (1992)

Geoffrey S. Loomis (born December 22, 1970) is an American college baseball coach and former infielder. Loomis is the head coach of the Portland Pilots baseball team.

== Amateur career ==
Loomis attended Oregon City High School in Oregon City, Oregon. Loomis played for the school's varsity baseball team. Loomis then enrolled at the University of Portland, to play college baseball for the Portland Pilots baseball team.

As a freshman at the University of Portland in 1990, Loomis had a .397 batting average, a .303 on-base percentage (OBP) and a .329 SLG.

As a sophomore in 1991, Loomis batted .397 with a .668 SLG, 10 home runs, and 53 RBIs.

In the 1992 season as a junior, Loomis hit 11 home runs, 22 doubles, 1 triple and 56 RBIs. He was named First Team All-Pac-10 Conference and the Pac-10 Player of the Year.

== Professional career ==
Loomis was drafted in the 31st round by the Oakland Athletics in the 1992 Major League Baseball draft.

Loomis began his professional career with the Southern Oregon A's of the Class A Northwest League, where he batted .254 with five home runs. He returned to the Southern Oregon A's in 1993. He hit .247 with three home runs for Southern Oregon.

== Coaching career ==
On June 10, 2015, Loomis was hired as the head coach of Portland.

== Head coaching record ==
Statistics overview
Season	Team	Overall	Conference	Standing	Postseason
Pacific Lutheran Lutes (Northwest Conference) (2003–2015)
2003	Pacific Lutheran	12–26	11–12	7th	
2004	Pacific Lutheran	23–16	15–9	3rd	
2005	Pacific Lutheran	25–14	19–5	3rd	
2006	Pacific Lutheran	23–17	13–11	4th	
2007	Pacific Lutheran	35–9	21–3	1st	NCAA West Regional
2008	Pacific Lutheran	24–14–2	21–11	3rd	
2009	Pacific Lutheran	31–9	27–5	T-1st	
2010	Pacific Lutheran	30–10	18–6	2nd	
2011	Pacific Lutheran	19–20	13–11	T-5th	
2012	Pacific Lutheran	24–16	16–8	3rd	
2013	Pacific Lutheran	22–18	12–12	T-4th	
2014	Pacific Lutheran	25–14	16–8	2nd	
2015	Pacific Lutheran	32–14	18–6	1st	NCAA South Regional
Pacific Lutheran:		325–197–2	220–107		
Portland Pilots (West Coast Conference) (2016–present)
2016	Portland	17–37	3–24	10th	
2017	Portland	10–41–1	5–22	10th	
2018	Portland	23–30	12–15	7th	
2019	Portland	25–27	7–19	9th	
2020	Portland	12–4	0–0		Season canceled due to COVID-19
2021	Portland	24–26	14–13	5th	
2022	Portland	32–23	17–10	T–2nd	WCC tournament
2023	Portland	31–23	17–10	T–2nd	WCC tournament
2024	Portland	37–19	19–5	2nd	WCC tournament
2025	Portland	22–30	13–11	5th	WCC tournament
Portland:		233–260–1	107–129		
Total:		558–457–3			
National champion Postseason invitational champion Conference regular season champion Conference regular season and conference tournament champion Division regular season champion Division regular season and conference tournament champion Conference tournament champion

== See also ==
- List of current NCAA Division I baseball coaches
