= Alberto Rios (baseball) =

American baseball player (born 2002)

Los Angeles Angels – No. 98
- Outfielder / Catcher
- Born: March 19, 2002 (age 24); Bellflower, California, U.S.
- Bats: Right Throws: Right

Alberto Rios (born March 19, 2002) is an American professional baseball outfielder and catcher in the Los Angeles Angels organization. He played college baseball for the Stanford Cardinal, where he was a consensus All-America selection and was selected as the Pac-12 Conference Player of the Year in 2023.

== Early life and amateur career ==
Rios grew up in Bellflower, California and attended St. John Bosco High School.

Rios played college baseball at Stanford. He was moved from the infield to catcher prior to his freshman year. Rios barely played during his first two seasons with the Cardinal, appearing in eight games and going hitless in seven at-bats. He moved to the outfield before the start of his junior season and entered the season in the Cardinal's starting lineup. Rios batted .384 with 18 home runs and was named the Pac-12 Conference Baseball Player of the Year and a consensus first team All-American.

== Professional career ==
Rios was selected by the Los Angeles Angels in the third round of the 2023 Major League Baseball draft. He signed with the team and received a $847,500 signing bonus. Rios made his professional baseball debut on July 21 with the rookie-level Arizona Complex League Angels, going 1-for-3 with a run and an RBI against the ACL Diamondbacks. On July 25, he was promoted to the Class A Inland Empire 66ers of the California League.

Following the 2024 season, Rios played winter league baseball with the Sydney Blue Sox of the Australian Baseball League.
