= Elizabeth Prann =

American journalist

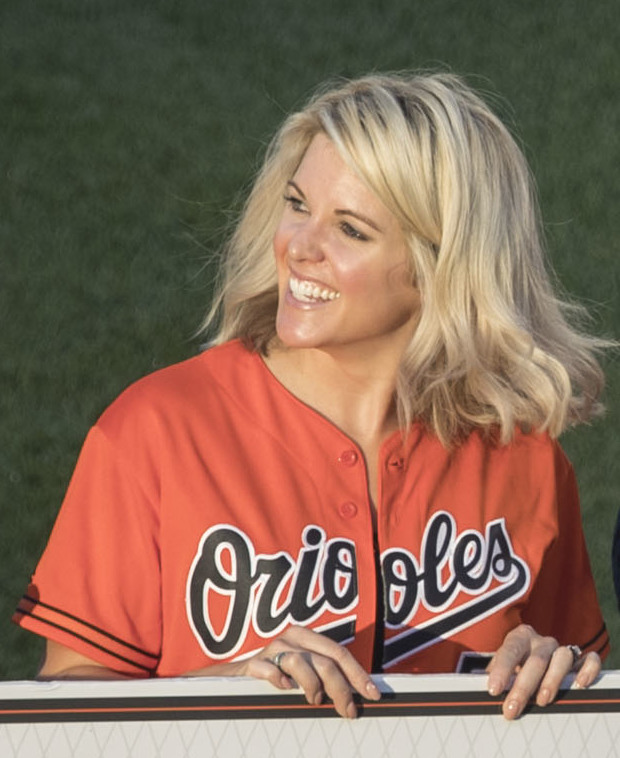
- Prann in 2016
- Born: Aurora, Colorado, US
- Education: University of Florida
- Occupation: HLN Anchor/Reporter
- Spouse: Darren O'Day (m. 2010)
- Children: 1

Elizabeth Prann is an anchor/reporter for NewsNation, formerly of HLN and the Fox News Channel. Prann previously worked from July 2008 to January 2010 as a reporter, fill-in anchor and producer for the Panama City affiliate of NBC, WJHG. She joined HLN in 2018.

== Biography ==
Prann received a bachelor's degree in journalism from the University of Florida, where she was a member of the women's lacrosse team and the Delta Gamma sorority.

She first worked for Fox News as a production assistant for On the Record w/ Greta Van Susteren from 2006 to 2008. In that capacity, Prann played a significant role in the launch of Gretawire.com; creating podcasts and developing content for the website. She joined Fox News as a correspondent in February 2010.

During the Deepwater Horizon oil spill, Prann reported extensively on the scene. During Fox News' immediate coverage of the West Fertilizer Plant explosion, she served as the network's anchor.

== Personal life ==
Prann married professional baseball pitcher Darren O'Day on November 20, 2010 at the Ritz-Carlton in Atlanta, Georgia.
