= Pac-12 Conference Baseball Player of the Year =

- Awarded for: the most outstanding baseball player in the Pac-12 Conference
- Country: United States
- First award: 1978
- Currently held by: Travis Bazzana, Oregon State

The Pac-12 Conference Player of the Year is a baseball award given to the Pac-12 Conference's most outstanding player. From 1978 to 1998, an award was given to the most outstanding player in both the North and South divisions, with both pitchers and position players eligible. After the 1999 season, the divisions were eliminated and the Pac-12 Conference Baseball Pitcher of the Year award was created to honor the most outstanding pitcher.

The conference collapsed after the 2024 season, when 10 of its previous 12 full members, nine of which sponsored baseball, left for other conferences. Only Oregon State and Washington State remained; during the conference's two-season hiatus, Oregon State played as an independent and Washington State was a Mountain West Conference affiliate. The Pac-12 resumed full operation in July 2026 with the addition of seven new full members, four of which sponsor baseball, plus new baseball affiliate Dallas Baptist.

== Key ==
†	Co-Players of the Year
*	Awarded a national Player of the Year award: the Dick Howser Trophy or the Golden Spikes Award
Player (X)	Denotes the number of times the player had been awarded the Player of the Year award at that point

== Winners ==
=== 1999–present ===
Season	Player	School	Position	Reference
1999	Willie Bloomquist	Arizona State	SS	
2000	Casey Myers	Arizona State	C	
2001	Casey Myers (2)	Arizona State	C	
2002	Alberto Concepción	Southern California	C	
2003^{†}	Ryan Garko	Stanford	C	
2003^{†}	Dustin Pedroia	Arizona State	SS	
2004	Jed Lowrie	Stanford	2B	
2005^{†}	Trevor Crowe	Arizona	OF	
2005^{†}	Jacoby Ellsbury	Oregon State	OF	
2006	Cole Gillespie	Oregon State	OF	
2007	Brett Wallace	Arizona State	1B	
2008	Brett Wallace (2)	Arizona State	3B	
2009	Jason Kipnis	Arizona State	OF	
2010	Zack MacPhee	Arizona State	2B	
2011	Tony Renda	California	IF	
2012	Alex Mejia	Arizona	SS	
2013	Michael Conforto	Oregon State	OF	
2014	Michael Conforto (2)	Oregon State	OF	
2015	Scott Kingery	Arizona	2B	
2016	Brett Cumberland	California	C	
2017	Nick Madrigal	Oregon State	IF	
2018	Andrew Vaughn	California	1B	
2019	Adley Rutschman*	Oregon State	C	
2021	Aaron Zavala	Oregon	OF / 3B	
2022	Jacob Melton	Oregon State	OF	
2023	Alberto Rios	Stanford	OF / C	
2024	Travis Bazzana	Oregon State	IF	

=== North Division (1978–1998) ===
Season	Player	School	Position	Reference
1978	Dave Elder	Washington State	3B	
1979	Tom Dodd	Oregon	OF	
1980	Glen Walker	Washington State	OF	
1981	Al Hunsinger	Oregon State	1B	
1982	Jim Wilson	Oregon State	1B	
1983	Jeff Reece	Oregon State	P	
1984	John Skurla	Washington State	OF	
1985	Don Lovell	Portland State	OF	
1986	Dave Brundage	Oregon State	P	
1987	Ken Bowen	Oregon State	SS	
1988	John Olerud	Washington State	P/DH	
1989	Tim Kuykendall	Washington State	OF	
1990	Dane Walker	Portland State	OF	
1991	Scott Hatteberg	Washington State	C	
1992	Geoff Loomis	Portland	3B	
1993	Scott Christman	Oregon State	P	
1994	Mason Smith	Oregon State	P	
1995	Darin Blood	Gonzaga	P	
1996	Kevin Miller	Washington	SS	
1997	Kevin Miller (2)	Washington	SS	
1998	Andrew Checketts	Oregon State	P	

=== South Division (1978–1998) ===
Season	Player	School	Position	Reference
1978	Tim Tolman	Southern California	OF	
1979	Jim Auten	UCLA	OF	
1980	Terry Francona*	Arizona	OF	
1981	Mike Sodders	Arizona State	IF	
1982	Alvin Davis	Arizona State	1B	
1983	Erik Hardgrave	Stanford	1B	
1984^{†}	Oddibe McDowell*	Arizona State	OF	
1984^{†}	Mark McGwire	Southern California	1B	
1985	Rick Lundblade	Stanford	1B	
1986^{†}	Torey Lovullo	UCLA	IF	
1986^{†}	Alex Sanchez	UCLA	P	
1987^{†}	Torey Lovullo (2)	UCLA	IF	
1987^{†}	Chip Hale	Arizona	IF	
1988	Linty Ingram	Arizona State	P	
1989^{†}	Scott Erickson	Arizona	P	
1989^{†}	Alan Zinter	Arizona	1B	
1990	Paul Ellis	UCLA	C	
1991	David McCarty	Stanford	OF	
1992^{†}	Troy Penix	California	1B	
1992^{†}	Jon Zuber	California	P	
1993^{†}	Paul LoDuca	Arizona State	C	
1993^{†}	Ryan McGuire	UCLA	1B	
1994	Jacob Cruz	Arizona State	OF	
1995^{†}	A. J. Hinch	Stanford	C	
1995^{†}	Geoff Jenkins	Southern California	OF	
1996	A. J. Hinch (2)	Stanford	C	
1997	Troy Glaus	UCLA	3B	
1998	Eric Valent	UCLA	OF	

== Winners by school ==
School (year joined) (Note: For purposes of this table, the "year joined" reflects the year that each team joined the conference now known as the Pac-12 as currently chartered. Although the Pac-12 claims the Pacific Coast Conference (PCC), founded in 1915, as part of its own history, that conference disbanded in 1959 due to infighting and scandal. That same year, five PCC members established the Athletic Association of Western Universities (AAWU) under a new charter that functions to this day. The Player of the Year Award was not established until 1978, by which time all of the final members of the PCC except for Idaho were reunited in what was then the Pac-8. Also, the year of joining is the calendar year before each team's first Pac-12 baseball season.)	Winners	Years
Oregon State (1964, 2026) (Note: During the Pac-12's hiatus from 2024–2026, Oregon State played baseball as a Division I independent.)	16	1981, 1982, 1983, 1986, 1987, 1993, 1994, 1998, 2005^{†}, 2006, 2013, 2014, 2017, 2019, 2022, 2024
Arizona State (1978) (Note: After the 2024 season, 10 of the previous 12 full members, nine of which sponsor baseball, left for other conferences: Arizona, Arizona State, Utah, and non-baseball Colorado joined the Big 12 Conference.; California and Stanford joined the Atlantic Coast Conference.; Oregon, UCLA, USC, and Washington joined the Big Ten Conference.)	14	1981, 1982, 1984^{†}, 1988, 1993, 1994, 1999, 2000, 2001, 2003^{†}, 2007, 2008, 2009, 2010
Stanford (1959)	8	1983, 1985, 1991, 1995^{†}, 1996, 2003^{†}, 2004, 2023
UCLA (1959)	7	1979, 1986^{†}, 1987^{†}, 1990, 1993^{†}, 1997, 1998
Washington State (1962, 2026) (Note: During the Pac-12's hiatus from 2024–2026, Washington State played baseball in the Mountain West Conference.)	6	1978, 1980, 1984, 1988, 1989, 1991
California (1959)	5	1992^{†}, 1992^{†}, 2011, 2016, 2018
Arizona (1978)	4	1980, 1987, 2005^{†}, 2012
USC (1959)	4	1978, 1984^{†}, 1995, 2002
Portland State (1981) (Note: Portland State was an affiliate member of the Pac-10 from 1981 to 1998.)	2	1985, 1990
Washington (1959)	2	1996, 1997
Gonzaga (1981, 2026) (Note: Gonzaga was an affiliate member of the Pac-10 from 1981 to 1995 before becoming a full Pac-12 member in 2026.)	1	1995
Oregon (1964) (Note: Oregon discontinued its baseball program after the 1981 season, re-instating it before the 2009 season.)	1	1979
Portland (1981) (Note: Portland was an affiliate member of the Pac-10 from 1981 to 1995.)	1	1992
Dallas Baptist (2026)	0	
Fresno State (2026)	0	
San Diego State (2026)	0	
Texas State (2026)	0	
Utah (2011)	0	
