= Aaron Zavala =

American baseball player (born 2000)

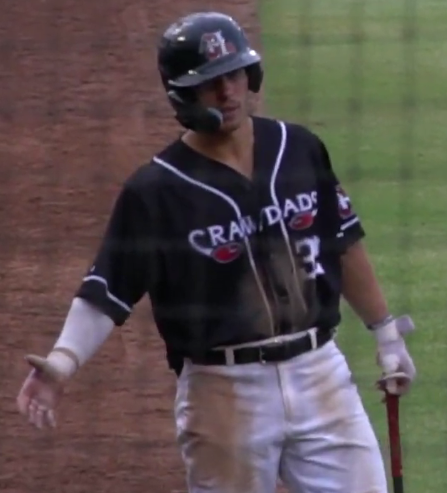
- Zavala with the Hickory Crawdads in 2022

Texas Rangers
- Outfielder
- Born: June 23, 2000 (age 26); Eugene, Oregon, U.S.
- Bats: Left Throws: Right

Aaron David Kenneth Zavala (born June 23, 2000) is an American professional baseball outfielder in the Texas Rangers organization. He played college baseball for the Oregon Ducks.

== Amateur career ==
Zavala grew up in Keizer, Oregon and attended South Salem High School, where he primarily played catcher on the baseball team. As a senior, he was named the Oregon Class 6A State Player of the Year after batting .561 with six home runs and 19 RBIs in 20 games played. Undrafted out of high school, he attended the University of Oregon to play college baseball for the Oregon Ducks.

Zavala played in 43 games with 37 starts as a freshman and batted .273 with nine doubles, 17 RBIs and 22 runs scored. Following that season he played collegiate summer baseball for the Ridgefield Raptors of the West Coast League. Zavala hit .418 with 22 RBIs through 15 games during sophomore season before it was cut short due to the coronavirus pandemic. As a redshirt sophomore, he was named the Pac-12 Conference Baseball Player of the Year and was a consensus first team All-American selection after batting for a .392 average with nine home runs, 38 RBIs, 64 runs scored and 11 stolen bases.

== Professional career ==
On July 12, 2021, Zavala was drafted by the Texas Rangers in the second round of the 2021 Major League Baseball draft. He signed with Texas on August 1, for a $830,000 signing bonus. During his routine physical before signing, Texas found a "medical anomaly," which led to his signing bonus being over a million dollars under the designated $1,952,300 slot value. Zavala split his professional debut season of 2021 between the ACL Rangers of the Rookie-level Arizona Complex League and the Down East Wood Ducks of the Low-A East, hitting a combined .293/.419/.400/.819 with 1 home run, 9 RBI, and 9 stolen bases over 22 games. Zavala opened the 2022 season with the Hickory Crawdads of the High-A South Atlantic League, and hit .278/.424/.442/.866 with 11 home runs, 41 RBI, and 19 stolen bases over 81 games. On July 30, Zavala was promoted to the Frisco RoughRiders of the Double-A Texas League. Over 30 games for Frisco, Zavala hit .277/.410/.482/.892 with 5 home runs, 21 RBI, and 4 stolen bases. Following the season he played for the Surprise Saguaros of the Arizona Fall League. After just 5 games in the AFL, Zavala was diagnosed with a torn UCL and underwent internal brace UCL repair surgery.

Zavala was assigned back to Frisco after completing rehab, and returned to game action on May 16, 2023. Zavala struggled mightily in 2023, hitting just .194/.343/.285/.627 with 5 home runs and 40 RBI, while striking out 159 times over 426 at-bats.
