= Ryon Healy =

American baseball player (born 1992)

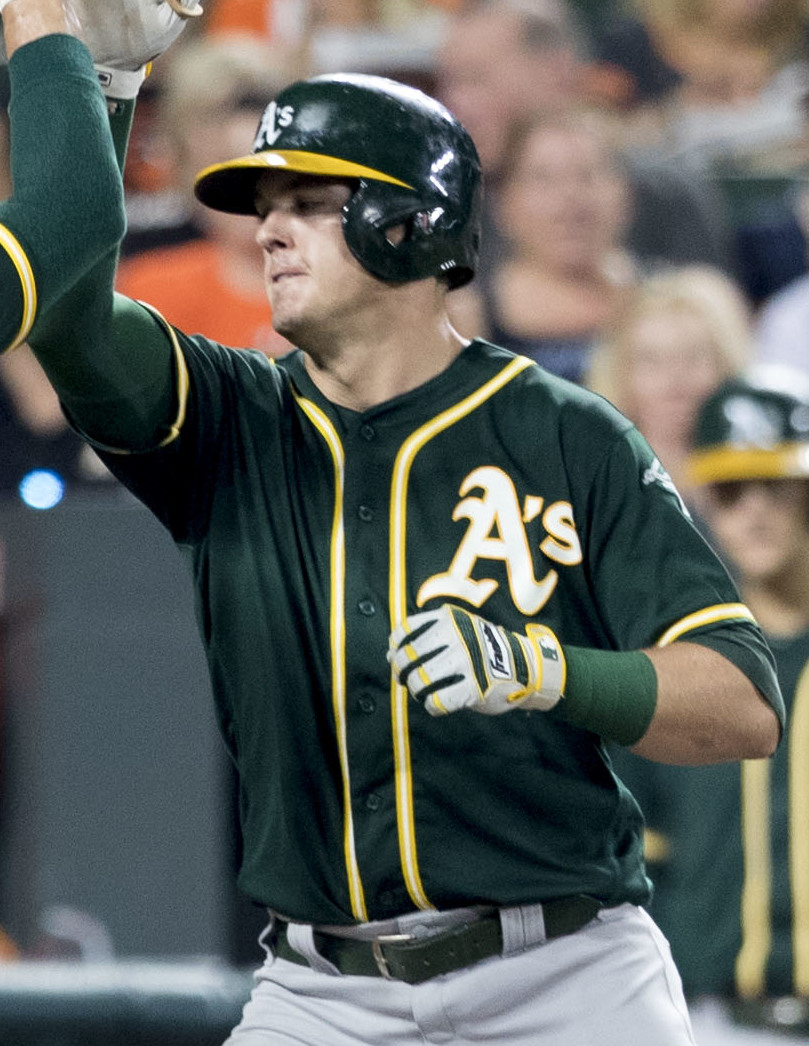
- Healy with the Oakland Athletics
- First baseman / Third baseman
- Born: January 10, 1992 (age 34); West Hills, California, U.S.
- Batted: Right Threw: Right

Professional debut
- MLB: July 15, 2016, for the Oakland Athletics
- KBO: April 4, 2021, for the Hanwha Eagles

Last appearance
- MLB: September 25, 2020, for the Milwaukee Brewers
- KBO: July 2, 2021, for the Hanwha Eagles

MLB statistics
- Batting average: .261
- Home runs: 69
- Runs batted in: 214

KBO statistics
- Batting average: .257
- Home runs: 7
- Runs batted in: 37
- Stats at Baseball Reference

Teams
- Oakland Athletics (2016–2017); Seattle Mariners (2018–2019); Milwaukee Brewers (2020); Hanwha Eagles (2021)

Ryon Cristopher Healy (born January 10, 1992) is an American former professional baseball first baseman and third baseman. He played in Major League Baseball (MLB) for the Oakland Athletics, Seattle Mariners, and Milwaukee Brewers, and in the KBO League for the Hanwha Eagles.

== Amateur career ==
Healy attended Crespi Carmelite High School in Encino, California. Undrafted out of high school, Healy enrolled at the University of Oregon, where he played college baseball as a first baseman for the Oregon Ducks. As a junior, Healy set a Ducks single-season record with 56 runs batted in (RBIs), and a career record with 118 RBIs. In 2011, he played collegiate summer baseball with the Cotuit Kettleers of the Cape Cod Baseball League, and returned to the league in 2012 with an all-star season for the Brewster Whitecaps.

== Professional career ==
=== Oakland Athletics ===
The Oakland Athletics selected Healy in the third round of the 2013 Major League Baseball draft. Healy subsequently signed with the Athletics.

In 2014, Healy played for the Stockton Ports of the High-A California League, finishing the season with a .285 batting average, 16 home runs, and 83 RBI. While playing for the Midland RockHounds of the Double-A Texas League in 2015, Healy was named an All-Star. He was also named Texas League Player of the Week twice.

Without an invite to big league camp, Healy returned to Midland to begin the 2016 season. However, Healy went on to hit .338 with 8 home runs and 34 RBI in 36 games before earning a promotion to the Nashville Sounds of the Triple-A Pacific Coast League. He appeared in the 2016 All-Star Futures Game as Oakland's lone representative, and earned an unlikely promotion to the major leagues on July 15. In 49 games with Nashville, Healy hit .318 with 6 home runs and 30 RBI, splitting time at first base and third base.

Upon his promotion, Healy was immediately inserted by manager Bob Melvin as the team's third baseman, supplanting Danny Valencia. He recorded his first major league hit, a 3-run home run, on July 16 in a game against the Toronto Blue Jays. On July 24, Healy hit a walk-off home run against the Tampa Bay Rays, capping a three-run ninth-inning rally. On October 3, Healy was named the AL Rookie of the Month for the month of September, when he hit .355 with 7 home runs and 19 RBI to conclude his breakout season. In 72 games, Healy hit .305/.337/.524 with 13 home runs and 37 RBI, with a batting average that led all qualified AL rookies, reaching as high as third in the batting order.

Coming off of an impressive 2016, Healy was expected to enter 2017 as Oakland's permanent third baseman. However, plans changed when the team signed Trevor Plouffe on January 10, 2017, and was named the starting third baseman by general manager David Forst on January 18. The move allowed Healy to move to his natural position at first base. In early 2017, he split time between first base and designated hitter. He finished the season with a .271 average with 25 home runs and 78 runs batted in.

=== Seattle Mariners ===
On November 15, 2017, the Athletics traded Healy to the Seattle Mariners in exchange for Emilio Pagan and Alexander Campos. In his first season with the Mariners, Healy made 133 appearances and batted .235/.277/.412 with 24 home runs and 73 RBI.

The following season, Healy suffered multiple injuries while shifting from playing first base to third base. He was declared out for the season on August 2, 2019, as he would undergo hip surgery. In 47 games for Seattle, Healy had hit .237/.289/.456 with seven home runs and 26 RBI. On October 28, he was removed from the 40-man roster and sent outrighted to the Triple-A Tacoma Rainiers.

=== Milwaukee Brewers ===
On December 17, 2019, Healy signed a one-year contract with the Milwaukee Brewers. He played in 4 games for the Brewers, going 1-for-7 (.143) with 2 walks. On October 30, 2020, Healy was removed from the 40-man roster and sent outright to the Triple-A San Antonio Missions. He elected free agency on November 3.

=== Hanwha Eagles ===
On December 5, 2020, Healy signed a one-year, $800K deal with the Hanwha Eagles of the KBO League. Healy played in 67 games with Hanwha in 2021, batting .257/.306/.394 with 7 home runs and 37 RBI. On July 4, 2021, Healy was released by the Eagles.

=== Tampa Bay Rays ===
On March 19, 2022, Healy signed a minor league contract with the Tampa Bay Rays. He was released by the Rays organization on March 31.

== Post-playing career ==
On January 1, 2023, Healy announced his retirement from baseball via an Instagram post. He is now an entrepreneur with multiple businesses. He runs a realty group in the Phoenix, Arizona area, an athlete home-maintenance company, and a mobile coaching service.

Since 2026, Healy has been a member of the broadcasting crew for Mariners TV, providing occasional color commentary alongside Aaron Goldsmith.
