= Alex Mejia =

American baseball player (born 1991)

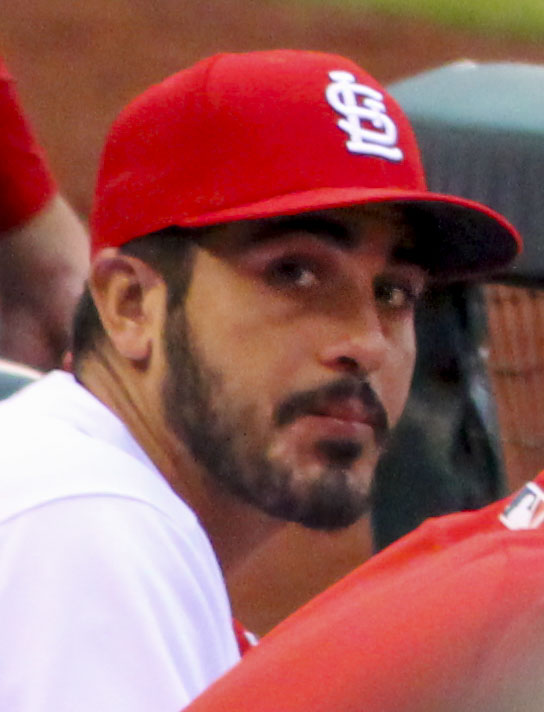
- Mejia with the St. Louis Cardinals in 2017

Charros de Jalisco – No. 7
- Infielder
- Born: January 18, 1991 (age 35); Sylmar, California, U.S.
- Bats: Right Throws: Right

MLB debut
- June 29, 2017, for the St. Louis Cardinals

MLB statistics (through 2017 season)
- Batting average: .109
- Home runs: 1
- Runs batted in: 3
- Stats at Baseball Reference

Teams
- St. Louis Cardinals (2017)

Alejandro DeJesus Mejia (born January 18, 1991) is an American professional baseball infielder for the Charros de Jalisco of the Mexican League. He played college baseball for the Arizona Wildcats, winning the 2012 College World Series. He has previously played in Major League Baseball (MLB) for the St. Louis Cardinals.

== Career ==
=== Amateur career ===
Mejia attended El Camino Real High School in Woodland Hills, California, and the University of Arizona. Playing college baseball for the Arizona Wildcats, Mejia became the team's starting shortstop as a freshman. He was named the 2012 Pac-12 Conference Baseball Player of the Year, and was a member of the 2012 College World Series champions.

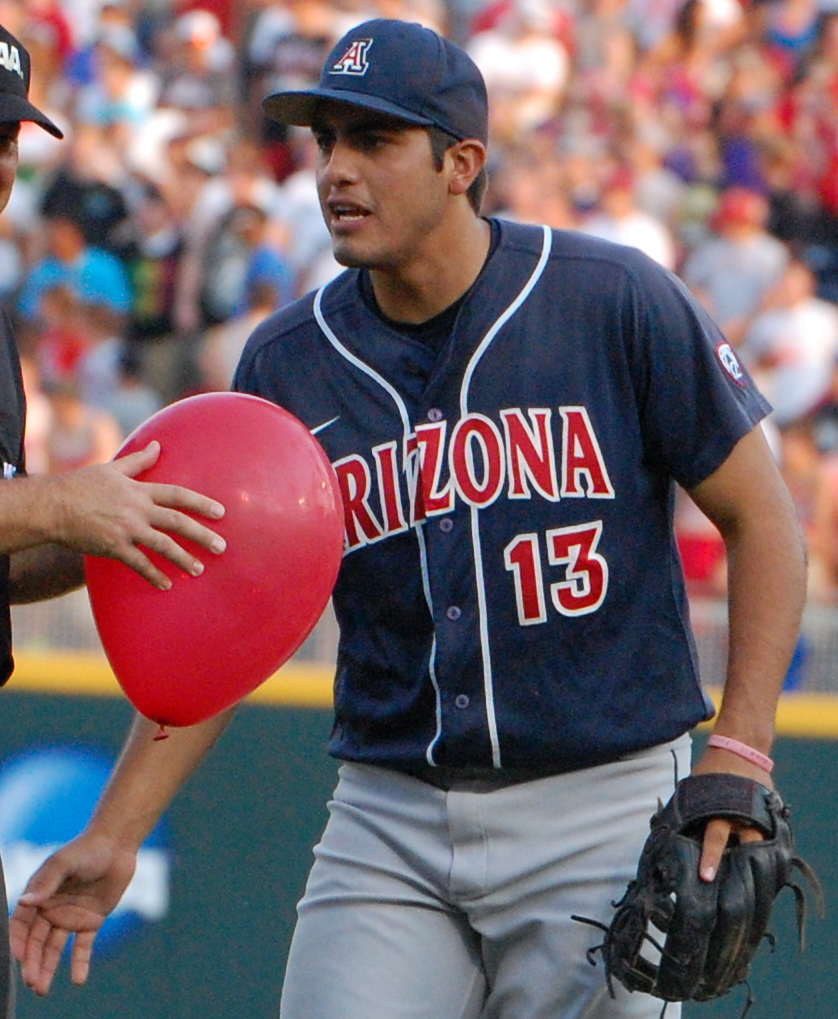
Mejia with Arizona at the 2012 College World Series

=== St Louis Cardinals ===
The St. Louis Cardinals selected Mejia in the fourth round, with the 150th overall selection, of the 2012 Major League Baseball draft. He signed with the Cardinals, receiving a $250,000 signing bonus, and made his professional debut with the Batavia Muckdogs of the Low–A New York–Penn League. He tore his anterior cruciate ligament during a July 31 game with the Muckdogs. Mejia played for the Peoria Chiefs of the Single–A Midwest League and the Palm Beach Cardinals of the High–A Florida State League in 2013. He began the 2014 season with Palm Beach, and was promoted to the Springfield Cardinals of the Double–A Texas League in July. He began the 2015 season with Springfield, and was promoted to the Memphis Redbirds of the Triple–A Pacific Coast League during the season.

Mejia began the 2017 season with Springfield, and was promoted to Memphis. On June 28, 2017, the Cardinals promoted Mejia to the major leagues. He made his debut the following day, against the Arizona Diamondbacks, when he started at second base and batted eighth, where he went 0-for-2 before being pinch hit for. He had first major league hit and home run against the Washington Nationals on July 1, 2017. He was outrighted to Memphis on November 6, 2017.

Mejia spent all of 2018 with Memphis, compiling a .273 batting average with four home runs and 35 RBI in 108 games. He helped lead Memphis to the 2018 Triple-A National Championship Game, where they defeated the Durham Bulls 14-4. Mejia was named the MVP of the game after going five-for-five with five RBI. He elected free agency following the season on November 2, 2018.

=== Acereros de Monclova ===
On January 24, 2019, Mejia signed with the Acereros de Monclova of the Mexican League for the 2019 season. He played in 93 games for a Monclova that year, slashing .350/.393/.496 with 9 home runs, 67 RBI, and 3 stolen bases. Mejia did not play in a game in 2020 due to the cancellation of the Mexican League season because of the COVID-19 pandemic.

Mejia appeared in 50 contests for the Acereros during the 2021 season, and posted a .313/.330/.400 slash to pair with 2 home runs, 31 RBI, and 2 stolen bases. In 2022, he appeared in 81 games, and markedly improved upon the year before, hitting .366/.389/.527 with 8 home runs, 59 RBI, and 3 stolen bases. In 2023, Mejia played in 36 games for Monclova, hitting .271/.343/.295 with no home runs and 17 RBI.

=== Saraperos de Saltillo ===
On March 1, 2024, Mejia was traded to the Saraperos de Saltillo in exchange for Francisco Pérez. In 73 appearances for the team, he slashed .281/.316/.370 with three home runs, 41 RBI, and one stolen base.

Mejia made 67 appearances for Saltillo during the 2025 campaign, in which he hit .329/.370/.418 with four home runs, 32 RBI, and two stolen bases.

In 2026, Mejia began his third season with the Saraperos, slashing .200/.225/.229 with no home runs and seven RBI across 36 games.

=== Charros de Jalisco ===
On June 8, 2026, Mejia and Manny Barreda were traded to the Charros de Jalisco of the Mexican League in exchange for Luis Payán and Donny Sands.

== Personal life ==
Mejia's father, Carlo, was named an All-American while playing college baseball for Pepperdine University in 1975, and played professionally in the Mexican League. Mejia has three siblings; his two older sisters and his cousin, played college softball for Long Island University.
