= 2012 Major League Baseball draft =

Major League Draft

General information
- Date: June 4–6, 2012
- Location: Secaucus, New Jersey
- Network: MLB Network

Overview
- 1,238 total selections
- First selection: Carlos Correa; Houston Astros
- First round selections: 60

The 2012 Major League Baseball draft was held from June 4 through June 6, 2012, from Studio 42 of the MLB Network in Secaucus, New Jersey. The Houston Astros, with the first overall pick, selected Carlos Correa from the Puerto Rico Baseball Academy and High School.

== Draft order ==
The draft order was determined by the 2011 Major League Baseball season standings. With the worst record in 2011, the Houston Astros received the first pick.

Also, teams can lose draft picks for signing certain free agents, while teams losing free agents will receive draft picks as compensation. The Elias Sports Bureau ranks all players based on performance over the past two seasons, with the top 20% being considered "Type A" and the next 20% considered "Type B". If a team offers a Type A free agent arbitration and he signs with another club, the player's former team obtains the new team's first- or second-round pick, depending on whether the new team is in the top 15 or bottom 15 in won-loss records in 2011, as well as a supplemental pick after the first round. If a team offers a Type B free agent arbitration and he signs with another club, the former team gets a supplemental pick after the first round.

The new Collective Bargaining Agreement between MLB and the MLBPA announced on November 22, modified the compensation required for certain Type A players. Six Type A players became modified Type A free agents, meaning a team signing one of them was not required to forfeit a draft pick, but the team losing them will receive a draft pick in the slot immediately before the pick they would have received had the player actually had Type A status. Five further Type A players became modified Type B free agents, with compensation equivalent to other Type B free agents.

Key
	All-Star/All-MLB Team
*	Player did not sign

=== First round ===
Pick	Player	Team	Position	School
1	Carlos Correa	Houston Astros	Shortstop	Puerto Rico Baseball Academy and High School
2	Byron Buxton	Minnesota Twins	Outfielder	Appling County High School (GA)
3	Mike Zunino	Seattle Mariners	Catcher	Florida
4	Kevin Gausman	Baltimore Orioles	Right-handed pitcher	Louisiana State
5	Kyle Zimmer	Kansas City Royals	Right-handed pitcher	San Francisco
6	Albert Almora	Chicago Cubs	Outfielder	Mater Academy (FL)
7	Max Fried	San Diego Padres	Left-handed pitcher	Harvard-Westlake School (CA)
8	Mark Appel*	Pittsburgh Pirates	Right-handed pitcher	Stanford
9	Andrew Heaney	Miami Marlins	Left-handed pitcher	Oklahoma State
10	David Dahl	Colorado Rockies	Outfielder	Oak Mountain High School (AL)
11	Addison Russell	Oakland Athletics	Shortstop	Pace High School (FL)
12	Gavin Cecchini	New York Mets	Shortstop	Barbe High School (LA)
13	Courtney Hawkins	Chicago White Sox	Outfielder	Carroll High School (TX)
14	Nick Travieso	Cincinnati Reds	Right-handed pitcher	Archbishop McCarthy High School (FL)
15	Tyler Naquin	Cleveland Indians	Outfielder	Texas A&M
16	Lucas Giolito	Washington Nationals	Right-handed pitcher	Harvard-Westlake School (CA)
17	D. J. Davis	Toronto Blue Jays	Outfielder	Stone High School (MS)
18	Corey Seager	Los Angeles Dodgers	Shortstop	Northwest Cabarrus High School (NC)
19	Michael Wacha	St. Louis Cardinals (Note: Pick from the Los Angeles Angels of Anaheim for the loss of Type A free agent Albert Pujols)	Right-handed pitcher	Texas A&M
20	Chris Stratton	San Francisco Giants	Right-handed pitcher	Mississippi State
21	Lucas Sims	Atlanta Braves	Right-handed pitcher	Brookwood High School (GA)
22	Marcus Stroman	Toronto Blue Jays (Note: Compensation for unsigned 2011 pick Tyler Beede)	Right-handed pitcher	Duke
23	James Ramsey	St. Louis Cardinals	Outfielder	Florida State
24	Deven Marrero	Boston Red Sox	Shortstop	Arizona State
25	Richie Shaffer	Tampa Bay Rays	Third baseman	Clemson
26	Stryker Trahan	Arizona Diamondbacks	Catcher	Acadiana High School (LA)
27	Clint Coulter	Milwaukee Brewers (Note: Pick from the Detroit Tigers for the loss of Type A free agent Prince Fielder)	Catcher	Union High School (WA)
28	Victor Roache	Milwaukee Brewers	Outfielder	Georgia Southern
29	Lewis Brinson	Texas Rangers	Outfielder	Coral Springs High School (FL)
30	Ty Hensley	New York Yankees	Right-handed pitcher	Santa Fe High School (OK)
31	Brian Johnson	Boston Red Sox (Note: Pick from the Philadelphia Phillies for the loss of Type A free agent Jonathan Papelbon)	Left-handed pitcher	Florida

=== Supplemental first round ===
Pick	Player	Team	Position	School
32	José Berríos	Minnesota Twins (Note: Compensation for the loss of Modified Type A free agent Michael Cuddyer)	Right-handed pitcher	Papa Juan XXIII High School
33	Zach Eflin	San Diego Padres (Note: Compensation for the loss of Modified Type A free agent Heath Bell)	Right-handed pitcher	Hagerty High School (FL)
34	Daniel Robertson	Oakland Athletics (Note: Compensation for the loss of Modified Type A free agent Josh Willingham)	Third baseman	Upland High School (CA)
35	Kevin Plawecki	New York Mets (Note: Compensation for the loss of Type A free agent José Reyes)	Catcher	Purdue
36	Stephen Piscotty	St. Louis Cardinals (Note: Compensation for the loss of Type A free agent Albert Pujols)	Third baseman	Stanford
37	Pat Light	Boston Red Sox (Note: Compensation for the loss of Type A free agent Jonathan Papelbon)	Right-handed pitcher	Monmouth
38	Mitch Haniger	Milwaukee Brewers (Note: Compensation for the loss of Type A free agent Prince Fielder)	Outfielder	Cal Poly
39	Joey Gallo	Texas Rangers (Note: Compensation for the loss of Type A free agent C. J. Wilson)	Third baseman	Bishop Gorman High School (NV)
40	Shane Watson	Philadelphia Phillies (Note: Compensation for the loss of Modified Type A free agent Ryan Madson)	Right-handed pitcher	Lakewood High School (CA)
41	Lance McCullers Jr.	Houston Astros (Note: Compensation for the loss of Type B free agent Clint Barmes)	Right-handed pitcher	Jesuit High School (FL)
42	Luke Bard	Minnesota Twins (Note: Compensation for the loss of Type B free agent Jason Kubel)	Right-handed pitcher	Georgia Tech
43	Pierce Johnson	Chicago Cubs (Note: Compensation for the loss of Type B free agent Aramis Ramírez)	Right-handed pitcher	Missouri State
44	Travis Jankowski	San Diego Padres (Note: Compensation for the loss of Type B free agent Aaron Harang)	Outfielder	Stony Brook
45	Barrett Barnes	Pittsburgh Pirates (Note: Compensation for the loss of Type B free agent Ryan Doumit)	Outfielder	Texas Tech
46	Eddie Butler	Colorado Rockies (Note: Compensation for the loss of Type B free agent Mark Ellis)	Right-handed pitcher	Radford
47	Matt Olson	Oakland Athletics (Note: Compensation for the loss of Type B free agent David DeJesus)	First baseman	Parkview High School (GA)
48	Keon Barnum	Chicago White Sox (Note: Compensation for the loss of Type B free agent Mark Buehrle)	First baseman	King High School (FL)
49	Jesse Winker	Cincinnati Reds (Note: Compensation for the loss of Modified Type B free agent Ramón Hernández)	Outfielder	Olympia High School (FL)
50	Matt Smoral	Toronto Blue Jays (Note: Compensation for the loss of Type B free agent Frank Francisco)	Left-handed pitcher	Solon High School (OH)
51	Jesmuel Valentín	Los Angeles Dodgers (Note: Compensation for the loss of Type B free agent Rod Barajas)	Shortstop	Puerto Rico Baseball Academy and High School
52	Patrick Wisdom	St. Louis Cardinals (Note: Compensation for the loss of Modified Type B free agent Octavio Dotel)	Third baseman	Saint Mary's
53	Collin Wiles	Texas Rangers (Note: Compensation for the loss of Modified Type B free agent Darren Oliver)	Right-handed pitcher	Blue Valley West High School (KS)
54	Mitch Gueller	Philadelphia Phillies (Note: Compensation for the loss of Type B free agent Raúl Ibañez)	Right-handed pitcher	W. F. West High School (WA)
55	Walker Weickel	San Diego Padres (Note: Compensation for unsigned 2011 pick Brett Austin)	Right-handed pitcher	Olympia High School (FL)
56	Paul Blackburn	Chicago Cubs (Note: Compensation for the loss of Type B free agent Carlos Peña)	Right-handed pitcher	Heritage High School (CA)
57	Jeff Gelalich	Cincinnati Reds (Note: Compensation for the loss of Modified Type B free agent Francisco Cordero)	Outfielder	UCLA
58	Mitch Nay	Toronto Blue Jays (Note: Compensation for the loss of Type B free agent Jon Rauch)	Third baseman	Hamilton High School (AZ)
59	Steve Bean	St. Louis Cardinals (Note: Compensation for the loss of Type B free agent Edwin Jackson)	Catcher	Rockwall High School (TX)
60	Tyler Gonzales	Toronto Blue Jays (Note: Compensation for the loss of Type B free agent José Molina)	Right-handed pitcher	James Madison High School (TX)

== Other notable selections ==
Round	Pick	Player	Team	Position	School
2	61	Nolan Fontana	Houston Astros	Shortstop	Florida
2	62	Bruce Maxwell	Oakland Athletics	Catcher	Birmingham–Southern College
2	65	Branden Kline	Baltimore Orioles	Right-handed pitcher	Virginia
2	66	Sam Selman	Kansas City Royals	Left-handed pitcher	Vanderbilt
2	67	Duane Underwood Jr.	Chicago Cubs	Right-handed pitcher	Alan C. Pope High School (GA)
2	71	Matt Reynolds	New York Mets	Third baseman	Arkansas
2	72	J. T. Chargois	Minnesota Twins	Right-handed pitcher	Rice
2	76	Chris Beck	Chicago White Sox	Right-handed pitcher	Georgia Southern
2	77	Dylan Cozens	Philadelphia Phillies	Outfielder	Chaparral High School (AZ)
2	80	Tony Renda	Washington Nationals	Second baseman	University of California, Berkeley
2	81	Chase De Jong	Toronto Blue Jays	Right-handed pitcher	Woodrow Wilson Classical High School (CA)
2	82	Paco Rodriguez	Los Angeles Dodgers	Left-handed pitcher	Florida
2	85	Alex Wood	Atlanta Braves	Left-handed pitcher	Georgia
2	86	Carson Kelly	St. Louis Cardinals	Third baseman	Westview High School (OR)
2	87	Jamie Callahan	Boston Red Sox	Right-handed pitcher	Dillon High School (SC)
2	89	Austin Aune	New York Yankees	Center fielder	Argyle High School (TX)
2	91	Jake Thompson	Detroit Tigers	Right-handed pitcher	Rockwall-Heath High School (TX)
2	93	Nick Williams	Texas Rangers	Center fielder	Ball High School (TX)
2	94	Peter O'Brien	New York Yankees	Catcher	Miami
3	96	Brady Rodgers	Houston Astros	Right-handed pitcher	Arizona State
3	98	Edwin Díaz	Seattle Mariners	Right-handed pitcher	Caguas Military Academy (PR)
3	105	Tom Murphy	Colorado Rockies	Catcher	Buffalo
3	107	Matt Koch	New York Mets	Right-handed pitcher	Louisville
3	112	Anthony Alford	Toronto Blue Jays	Outfielder	Petal High School (MS)
3	113	Onelki García	Los Angeles Dodgers	Left-handed pitcher	Cuba
3	114	R. J. Alvarez	Los Angeles Angels	Right-handed pitcher	Florida Atlantic
3	115	Mac Williamson	San Francisco Giants	Right fielder	Wake Forest
3	117	Tim Cooney	St. Louis Cardinals	Left-handed pitcher	Wake Forest
3	118	Austin Maddox	Boston Red Sox	Right-handed pitcher	Florida
3	119	Andrew Toles	Tampa Bay Rays	Center fielder	Chipola College
3	120	Jake Barrett	Arizona Diamondbacks	Right-handed pitcher	Arizona State
3	125	Zach Green	Philadelphia Phillies	Shortstop	Jesuit High School (CA)
4	129	Rio Ruiz	Houston Astros	Third baseman	Bishop Amat Memorial High School (CA)
4	131	Patrick Kivlehan	Seattle Mariners	Third baseman	Rutgers
4	132	Christian Walker	Baltimore Orioles	First baseman	South Carolina
4	135	Walker Lockett	San Diego Padres	Right-handed pitcher	Providence School (FL)
4	137	Austin Dean	Miami Marlins	Outfielder	Klein Collins High School (TX)
4	141	Brandon Brennan	Chicago White Sox	Right-handed pitcher	Orange Coast College
4	142	Jon Moscot	Cincinnati Reds	Right-handed pitcher	Pepperdine
4	148	Steven Okert	San Francisco Giants	Left-handed pitcher	Oklahoma
4	150	Alex Mejia	St. Louis Cardinals	Shortstop	Arizona
4	151	Ty Buttrey	Boston Red Sox	Right-handed pitcher	Providence High School (NC)
4	154	Drew VerHagen	Detroit Tigers	Right-handed pitcher	Vanderbilt
4	155	Tyler Wagner	Milwaukee Brewers	Right-handed pitcher	Utah
4	156	Alec Asher	Texas Rangers	Right-handed pitcher	Polk State College
5	160	Tyler Duffey	Minnesota Twins	Right-handed pitcher	Rice
5	161	Chris Taylor	Seattle Mariners	Shortstop	Virginia
5	162	Colin Poche*	Baltimore Orioles	Left-handed pitcher	Edward S. Marcus High School (TX)
5	165	Mallex Smith	San Diego Padres	Center fielder	Santa Fe Community College
5	166	Adrian Sampson	Pittsburgh Pirates	Right-handed pitcher	Bellevue College
5	167	Austin Nola	Miami Marlins	Shortstop	Louisiana State
5	169	Max Muncy	Oakland Athletics	First baseman	Baylor
5	174	Spencer Kieboom	Washington Nationals	Catcher	Clemson
5	176	Ross Stripling	Los Angeles Dodgers	Right-handed pitcher	Texas A&M
5	178	Ty Blach	San Francisco Giants	Left-handed pitcher	Creighton
5	185	Damien Magnifico	Milwaukee Brewers	Right-handed pitcher	Oklahoma
5	187	Rob Refsnyder	New York Yankees	Second baseman	Arizona
6	189	Brett Phillips	Houston Astros	Center fielder	Seminole High School (FL)
6	191	Tim Lopes	Seattle Mariners	Shortstop	Edison High School (CA)
6	198	Matt Carasiti	Colorado Rockies	Right-handed pitcher	St. John's
6	202	Joe Hudson	Cincinnati Reds	Catcher	Notre Dame
6	203	Joey Wendle	Cleveland Indians	Second baseman	West Chester
6	207	Eric Stamets	Los Angeles Angels	Shortstop	Evansville
6	211	Justin Haley	Boston Red Sox	Right-handed pitcher	Fresno State
6	213	Jake Lamb	Arizona Diamondbacks	Third baseman	Washington
6	217	Nick Goody	New York Yankees	Right-handed pitcher	Louisiana State
6	218	Cameron Perkins	Philadelphia Phillies	Third baseman	Purdue
7	219	Preston Tucker	Houston Astros	Outfielder	Florida
7	226	Jacob Stallings	Pittsburgh Pirates	Catcher	North Carolina
7	230	Corey Oswalt	New York Mets	Right-handed pitcher	James Madison High School (CA)
7	235	Ian Parmley	Toronto Blue Jays	Outfielder	Liberty
7	240	Kyle Barraclough	St. Louis Cardinals	Right-handed pitcher	Saint Mary's College
7	243	Andrew Velazquez	Arizona Diamondbacks	Shortstop	Fordham Preparatory School (NY)
7	248	Hoby Milner	Philadelphia Phillies	Left-handed pitcher	Texas
8	257	Drew Steckenrider	Miami Marlins	Right-handed pitcher	Tennessee
8	260	Tomás Nido	New York Mets	Catcher	Orangewood Christian School (FL)
8	267	Austin Adams	Los Angeles Angels	Right-handed pitcher	South Florida
8	272	Luke Maile	Tampa Bay Rays	Catcher	Kentucky
9	283	Daniel Stumpf	Kansas City Royals	Left-handed pitcher	San Jacinto College
9	287	Nick Wittgren	Miami Marlins	Right-handed pitcher	Purdue
9	291	Micah Johnson	Chicago White Sox	Second baseman	Indiana
9	297	Michael Roth	Los Angeles Angels	Left-handed pitcher	South Carolina
9	300	Rowan Wick	St. Louis Cardinals	Catcher	Cypress College
9	301	Mike Miller	Boston Red Sox	Shortstop	Cal Poly
9	302	Joey Rickard	Tampa Bay Rays	Center fielder	Arizona
10	320	Paul Sewald	New York Mets	Right-handed pitcher	San Diego
10	327	Chris O'Grady	Los Angeles Angels	Left-handed pitcher	George Mason
10	328	Trevor Brown	San Francisco Giants	Catcher	UCLA
10	335	Anthony Banda	Milwaukee Brewers	Left-handed pitcher	San Jacinto College
11	340	Taylor Rogers	Minnesota Twins	Left-handed pitcher	Kentucky
11	367	Caleb Frare	New York Yankees	Left-handed pitcher	Custer County High School (MT)
12	380	Rob Whalen	New York Mets	Right-handed pitcher	Haines City High School (FL)
12	396	Keone Kela	Texas Rangers	Right-handed pitcher	Everett Community College
13	410	Matt Bowman	New York Mets	Right-handed pitcher	Princeton
13	412	Matthew Boyd*	Cincinnati Reds	Left-handed pitcher	Oregon State
13	416	Darnell Sweeney	Los Angeles Dodgers	Shortstop	UCF
13	417	Mike Morin	Los Angeles Angels	Right-handed pitcher	North Carolina
13	421	J. B. Wendelken	Boston Red Sox	Right-handed pitcher	Middle Georgia College
13	422	Dylan Floro	Tampa Bay Rays	Right-handed pitcher	Cal State Fullerton
13	424	Devon Travis	Detroit Tigers	Second baseman	Florida State
13	427	James Pazos	New York Yankees	Left-handed pitcher	San Diego
14	433	Parker Morin	Kansas City Royals	Catcher	Utah
14	436	Walker Buehler*	Pittsburgh Pirates	Right-handed pitcher	Henry Clay High School (KY)
14	440	Chris Flexen	New York Mets	Right-handed pitcher	Newark Memorial High School (CA)
14	447	Sherman Johnson	Los Angeles Angels	Second baseman	Florida State
15	468	Scott Oberg	Colorado Rockies	Right-handed pitcher	Connecticut
15	475	Ryan Borucki	Toronto Blue Jays	Left-handed pitcher	Mundelein High School (IL)
15	481	Carson Fulmer*	Boston Red Sox	Right-handed pitcher	All Saints' Academy (FL)
15	485	Buck Farmer*	Milwaukee Brewers	Right-handed pitcher	Georgia Tech
15	486	Jameis Winston*	Texas Rangers	Center fielder	Hueytown High School (AL)
16	491	Dominic Leone	Seattle Mariners	Right-handed pitcher	Clemson
16	496	Max Moroff	Pittsburgh Pirates	Shortstop	Trinity Preparatory School (FL)
16	497	Brian Ellington	Miami Marlins	Right-handed pitcher	West Florida
17	526	Hayden Hurst	Pittsburgh Pirates	Right-handed pitcher	Bolles School (FL)
17	529	Tyler Olson*	Oakland Athletics	Left-handed pitcher	Gonzaga
17	537	Yency Almonte	Los Angeles Angels	Right-handed pitcher	Christopher Columbus High School (FL)
18	554	David Bote	Chicago Cubs	Shortstop	Neosho County Community College
18	562	Jackson Stephens	Cincinnati Reds	Right-handed pitcher	Oxford High School (AL)
18	563	Louis Head	Cleveland Indians	Right-handed pitcher	Texas State
18	568	Matt Duffy	San Francisco Giants	Shortstop	Long Beach State
18	577	Brady Lail	New York Yankees	Right-handed pitcher	Bingham High School (UT)
19	582	Josh Hader	Baltimore Orioles	Left-handed pitcher	Old Mill High School (MD)
19	583	Andrew Triggs	Kansas City Royals	Right-handed pitcher	USC
19	607	Dietrich Enns	New York Yankees	Left-handed pitcher	Central Michigan
20	619	Boog Powell	Oakland Athletics	Center fielder	Orange Coast College
20	620	Tim Peterson	New York Mets	Right-handed pitcher	Kentucky
20	626	Jharel Cotton	Los Angeles Dodgers	Right-handed pitcher	East Carolina
21	643	Matt Strahm	Kansas City Royals	Left-handed pitcher	Neosho County Community College
21	668	Drew Anderson	Philadelphia Phillies	Right-handed pitcher	Galena High School (NV)
22	673	Alec Mills	Kansas City Royals	Right-handed pitcher	UT Martin
22	676	Taylor Hearn*	Pittsburgh Pirates	Left-handed pitcher	Royse City High School (TX)
22	687	Anthony Bemboom	Los Angeles Angels	Catcher	Creighton
22	689	Shae Simmons	Atlanta Braves	Right-handed pitcher	Southeast Missouri
23	723	Matt Dermody*	Arizona Diamondbacks	Left-handed pitcher	Iowa
24	734	Jameson Fisher*	Chicago Cubs	Outfielder	Zachary High School (LA)
25	766	Josh Smith	Pittsburgh Pirates	Left-handed pitcher	Wichita State
25	776	Danny Coulombe	Los Angeles Dodgers	Left-handed pitcher	Texas Tech
26	800	Chris Shaw*	New York Mets	First baseman	Lexington High School (MA)
26	804	Skye Bolt*	Washington Nationals	Center fielder	Holy Innocents' Episcopal School (GA)
27	835	Daniel Zamora*	Toronto Blue Jays	Left-handed pitcher	Bishop Amat Memorial High School (CA)
28	877	DJ Stewart*	New York Yankees	Outfielder	Bolles School (FL)
28	878	Joe Mantiply*	Philadelphia Phillies	Left-handed pitcher	Virginia Tech
29	891	Jason Coats	Chicago White Sox	Left fielder	TCU
29	895	Cole Irvin*	Toronto Blue Jays	Left-handed pitcher	Servite High School (CA)
29	901	Alex Bregman*	Boston Red Sox	Second baseman	Albuquerque Academy (NM)
29	908	Brad Wieck*	Philadelphia Phillies	Left-handed pitcher	Frank Phillips College
30	911	Mike Yastrzemski*	Seattle Mariners	Right fielder	Vanderbilt
31	962	Taylor Ward*	Tampa Bay Rays	Catcher	Shadow Hills High School (CA)
31	965	Brent Suter	Milwaukee Brewers	Left-handed pitcher	Harvard
32	979	Ryan Dull	Oakland Athletics	Right-handed pitcher	UNC Asheville
32	991	Hunter Wood*	Boston Red Sox	Right-handed pitcher	Rogers Heritage High School (AR)
32	995	Nick Anderson*	Milwaukee Brewers	Right-handed pitcher	Mayville State
32	996	Alex Young*	Texas Rangers	Left-handed pitcher	Carmel High School (IL)
33	999	Mike Hauschild	Houston Astros	Right-handed pitcher	Dayton
33	1003	Evan Phillips*	Kansas City Royals	Right-handed pitcher	Clayton High School (NC)
33	1004	Thomas Pannone*	Chicago Cubs	Outfielder	Bishop Hendricken High School (RI)
33	1026	Ryan Burr*	Texas Rangers	Right-handed pitcher	Highlands Ranch High School (CO)
34	1029	Jordan Jankowski	Houston Astros	Right-handed pitcher	Catawba College
34	1052	Ryan Garton	Tampa Bay Rays	Right-handed pitcher	Florida Atlantic
35	1065	Wynton Bernard	San Diego Padres	Outfielder	Niagara
35	1071	Kyle Martin*	Chicago White Sox	Right-handed pitcher	Texas A&M
35	1087	Kyle Farmer*	New York Yankees	Shortstop	Georgia
35	1088	Steven Wilson*	Philadelphia Phillies	Right-handed pitcher	Dakota Ridge High School (CO)
36	1091	Trey Wingenter*	Seattle Mariners	Right-handed pitcher	Bob Jones High School (AL)
36	1097	Kendall Graveman*	Miami Marlins	Right-handed pitcher	Mississippi State
36	1109	Braden Bishop*	Atlanta Braves	Center fielder	Saint Francis High School (CA)
37	1123	Jake Newberry	Kansas City Royals	Right-handed pitcher	Mira Mesa Senior High School
37	1126	Jacob Waguespack*	Pittsburgh Pirates	Right-handed pitcher	Dutchtown High School (LA)
37	1132	Zach Vincej	Cincinnati Reds	Shortstop	Pepperdine
37	1138	Drew Jackson*	San Francisco Giants	Shortstop	Miramonte High School (CA)
38	1151	Richie Martin*	Seattle Mariners	Shortstop	Bloomingdale High School (FL)
38	1158	Dansby Swanson*	Colorado Rockies	Shortstop	Marietta High School (Georgia)
38	1162	Daniel Ponce de Leon*	Cincinnati Reds	Right-handed pitcher	Cypress College
38	1174	A. J. Minter*	Detroit Tigers	Left-handed pitcher	Brook Hill School (TX)
40	1211	James Kaprielian*	Seattle Mariners	Right-handed pitcher	Arnold O. Beckman High School (CA)
40	1229	Jimmy Herget*	Atlanta Braves	Right-handed pitcher	Thomas Jefferson High School (FL)
40	1238	Eric Hanhold*	Philadelphia Phillies	Right-handed pitcher	East Lake High School (FL)

== See also ==
- List of first overall Major League Baseball draft picks
