= Under Armour All-America Baseball Game =

High school baseball all-star game

The Under Armour High School All-America Baseball Game is a high school baseball all-star game held annually to spotlight the United States' top high school players who are juniors or seniors. The game is played in late July or August, at Wrigley Field in Chicago.

Since 2008 and through the 2018 Major League Baseball draft, 318 of the 361 draft-eligible players from the game have been selected in the MLB draft, including 98 first round picks.

== History ==
The game was first played in 2005 as the Cape Cod High School Baseball Classic presented by Under Armour (or simply the Cape Cod High School Classic) and was played at Spillane Field in Wareham, Massachusetts. Since 2008, Under Armour has served as the title sponsor, with the game hosted at Wrigley Field and enjoying a national audience. Under Armour and the Chicago Cubs have a partnership that preexists Under Armour's title sponsorship. Baseball Factory and Team One Baseball have been involved in both versions of the event, with a committee of their scouts selecting players for each year's game.

For several years starting in 2009, Cal Ripken served as the official ambassador of the game. In 2014, Kyler Murray became the first athlete to play in both the Under Armour All-America Baseball Game and the Under Armour All-America Football Game. Through January 2019, Murray, A. J. Brown, Jerrion Ealy, and Maurice Hampton are the only players to appear in both games. At least three Canadian players have appeared in the game; Phillippe Aumont in 2006, Jake Eliopoulos in 2008, and Evan Rutckyj in 2009.

The game is usually played on a Saturday, with related events beginning several days before, including a home run derby. In 2017, the game celebrated its 10th anniversary of title sponsorship by Under Armour; it was decided in extra innings and featured a walk-off hit, both firsts in the game's history, and was won by the American team, 2–1 in 11 innings.

== Game results ==
Year	Date	Site	Winning team		Losing team		Players	Network	Ref.
Cape Cod High School Baseball Classic presented by Under Armour
2005	July 29	Spillane Field	Baseball Factory East	5	Team One West	0	36	ESPNU	
2006	July 28	Spillane Field	Team One	6	Baseball Factory	1	36	MLB.com/ESPNU	
2007	July 27	Spillane Field	Baseball Factory	6	Team One	5	36	MLB.com	
Under Armour All-America Baseball Game
2008	August 17	Wrigley Field	Baseball Factory	5	Team One	4	35	ESPNU	
2009	August 8	Wrigley Field	Baseball Factory	11	Team One	6	36	ESPNU	
2010	August 15	Wrigley Field	American	7	National	0	36	MLB Network	
2011	August 13	Wrigley Field	National	6	American	4 (8)	36	MLB Network	
2012	August 18	Wrigley Field	American	7	National	6	36	MLB Network	
2013	August 24	Wrigley Field	American	8	National	7	36	MLB Network	
2014	August 16	Wrigley Field	American	2	National	1	38	MLB Network	
2015	August 15	Wrigley Field	National	11	American	5	40	MLB Network	
2016	July 23	Wrigley Field	National	5	American	4 (7)	40	MLB Network	
2017	July 29	Wrigley Field	American	2	National	1 (11)	39	MLB Network	
2018	July 20	Wrigley Field	American	8	National	2	40	MLB Network	
2019	July 22	Wrigley Field	National	4	American	3	40	MLB Network	

Note: games broadcast on MLB Network are usually streamed on MLB.com

== Notable alumni ==
=== 2005 ===
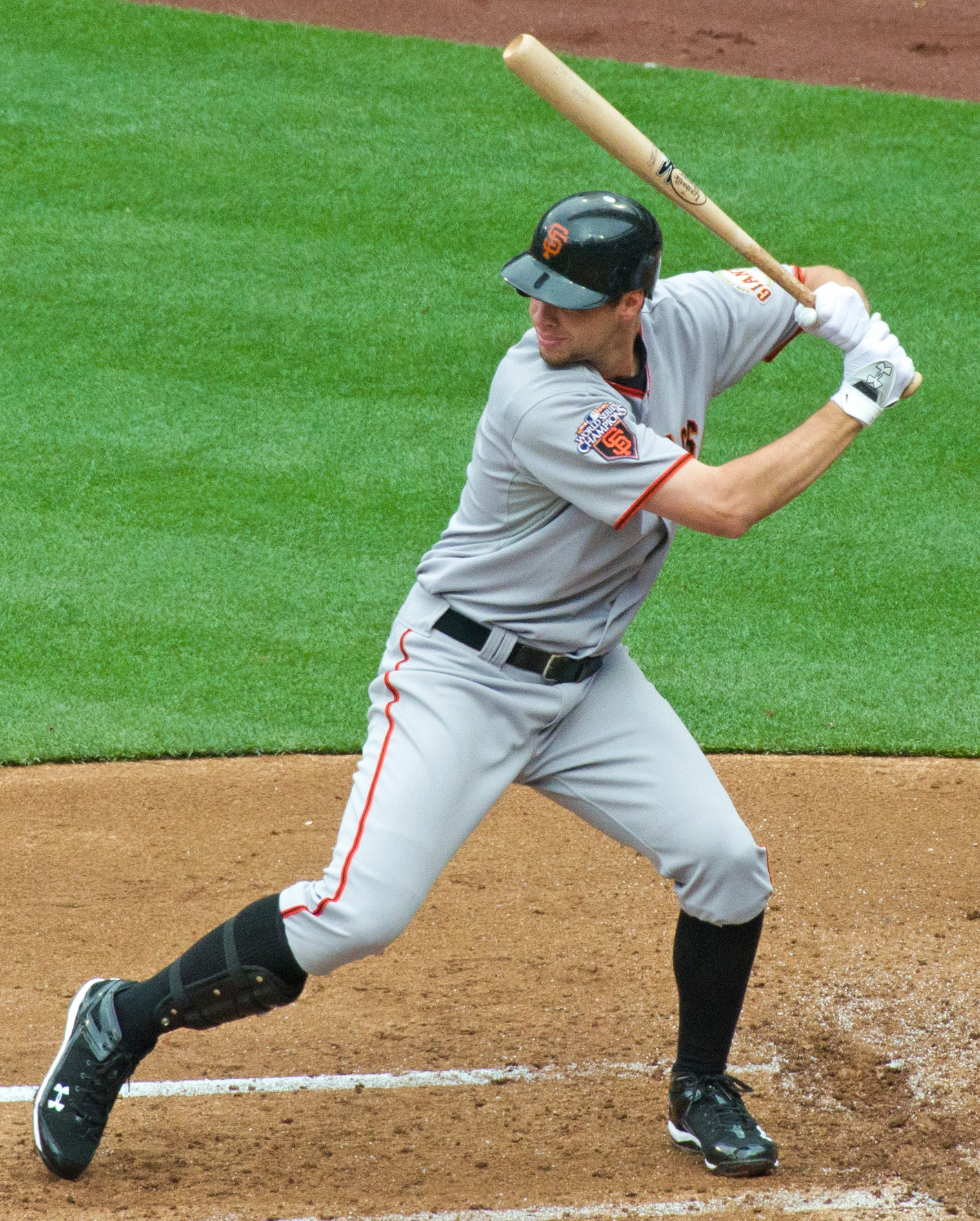
2005 alumnus Brandon Belt with the San Francisco Giants in 2011

- Brandon Belt
- Charles Brewer
- Adrian Cárdenas
- Jon Edwards
- Erik Goeddel
- Ryan Jackson
- Kasey Kiker
- Aaron Miller
- Chris Parmelee
- Cory Rasmus
- Devin Shepherd
- Shawn Tolleson

=== 2006 ===
- Phillippe Aumont
- Anthony Rizzo
- Josh Vitters

=== 2007 ===
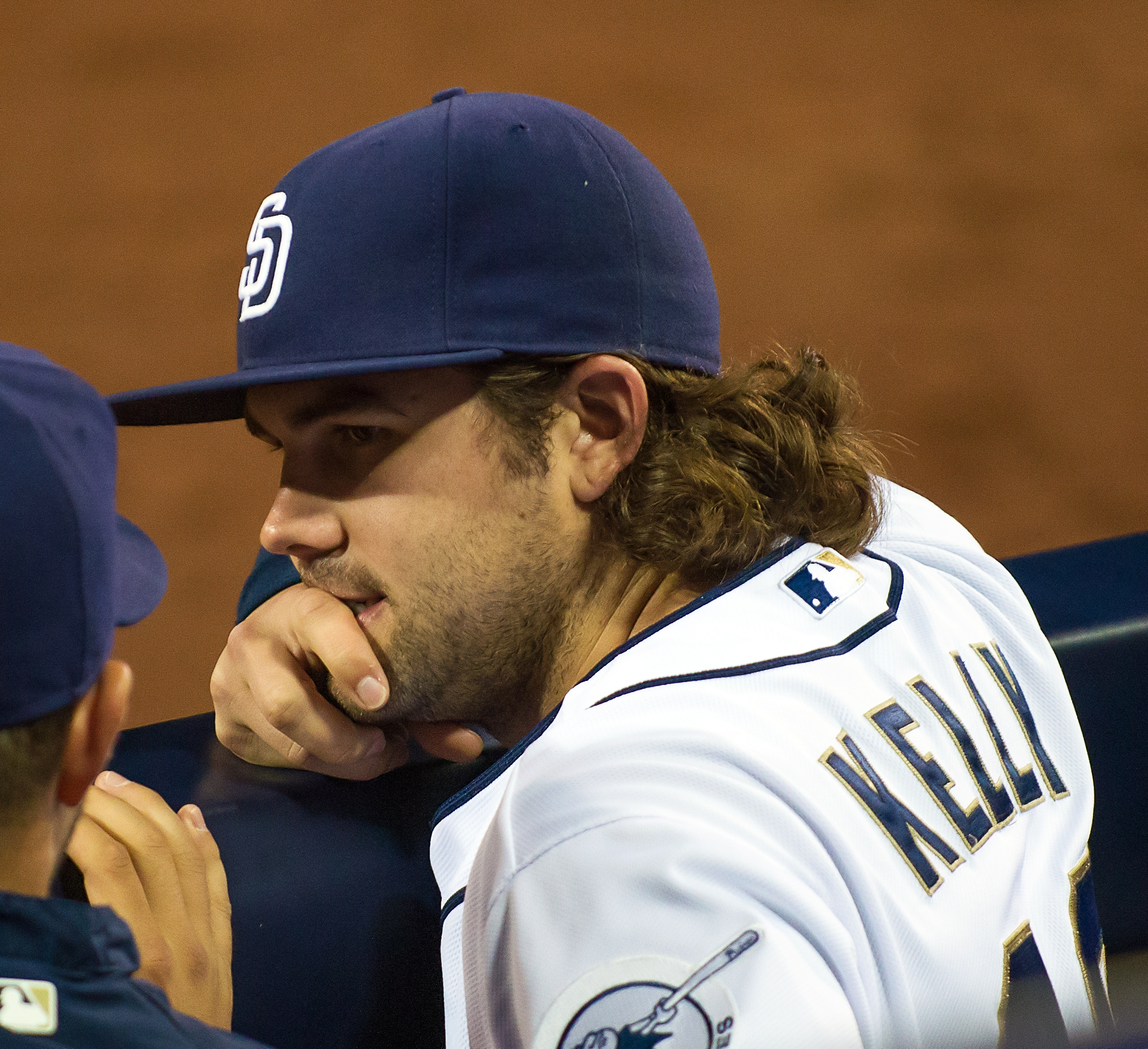
2007 alumnus Casey Kelly with the San Diego Padres in 2013

- Zack Cox
- L. J. Hoes
- Casey Kelly

=== 2008 ===
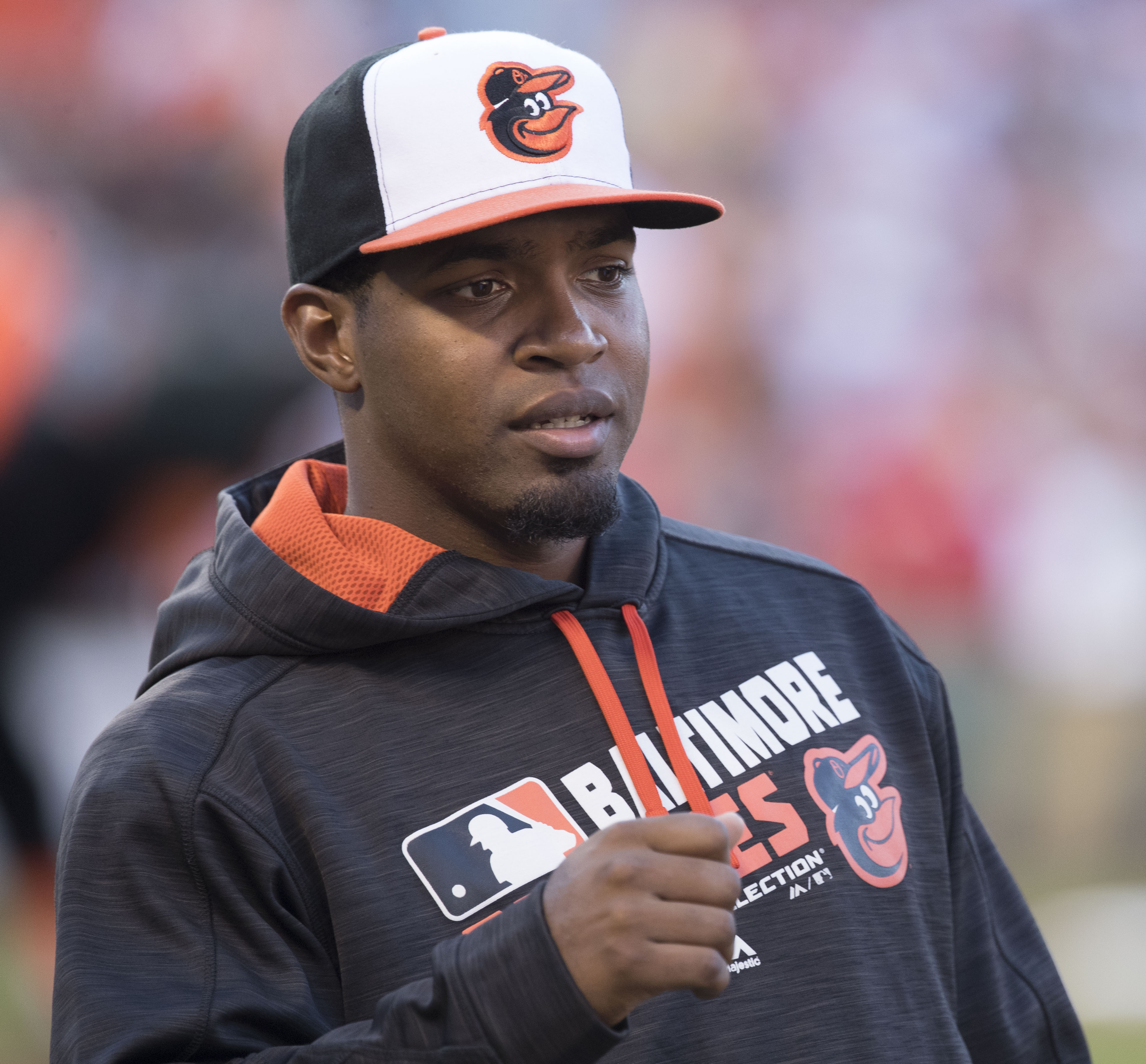
2008 alumnus Mychal Givens with the Baltimore Orioles in 2016

- Bobby Borchering
- Mychal Givens
- Brian Goodwin
- Matt Purke
- Max Stassi
- Donavan Tate
- Jacob Turner

=== 2009 ===
- Stetson Allie
- Nicholas Castellanos
- A. J. Cole
- Evan Rutckyj
- Austin Wilson

=== 2010 ===
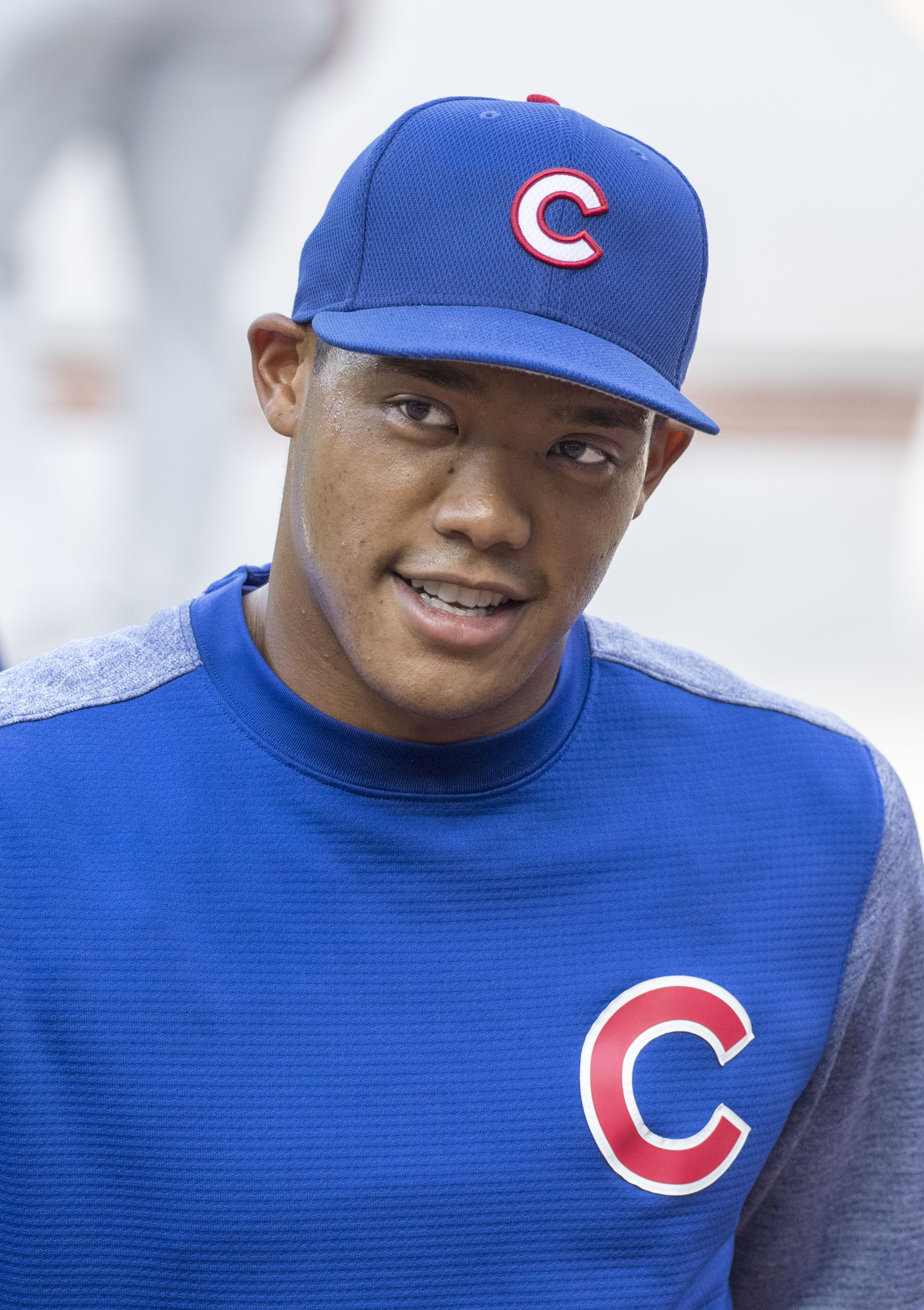
2010 alumnus Addison Russell with the Chicago Cubs in 2017

- Dante Bichette Jr.
- Nick Burdi
- Rookie Davis
- Brandon Nimmo
- Addison Russell
- Bubba Starling

=== 2011 ===
- Lewis Brinson
- Byron Buxton
- Gavin Cecchini
- Clint Coulter
- Carson Kelly
- Yairo Muñoz
- Franmil Reyes
- David Thompson
- Stryker Trahan
- Nick Travieso
- Jesmuel Valentín

=== 2012 ===
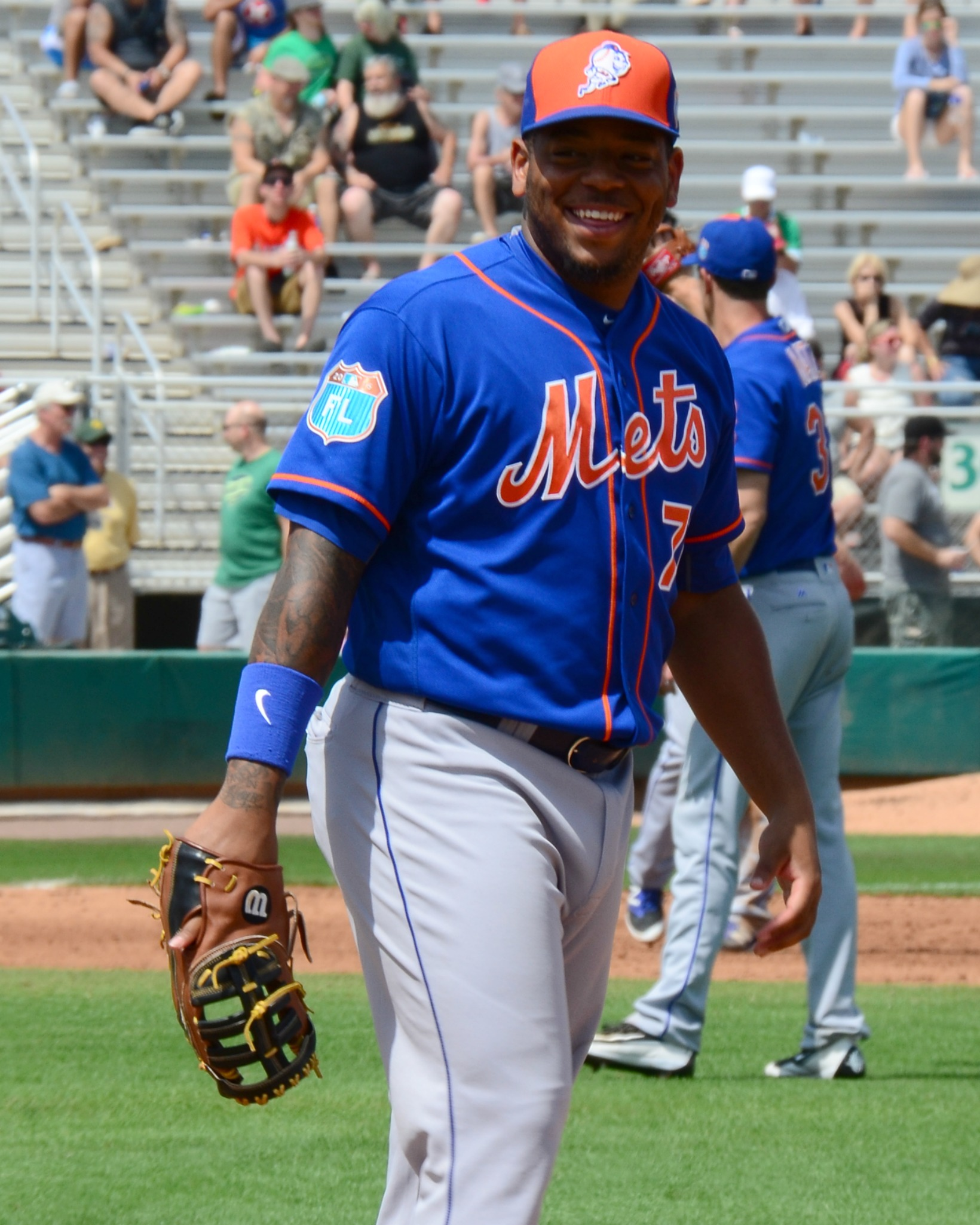
2012 alumnus Dominic Smith with the New York Mets in 2016

- Trey Ball
- Clint Frazier
- Billy McKinney
- Austin Meadows
- Dominic Smith
- Justin Williams

=== 2013 ===
- Daz Cameron
- Dylan Cease
- Greg Deichmann
- Luke Dykstra
- Jake Gatewood
- Michael Gettys
- Nick Gordon
- Foster Griffin
- Monte Harrison
- Grant Holmes
- Alex Jackson
- Tyler Kolek
- Michael Kopech
- Alex Lange
- Corbin Martin
- David Peterson
- Touki Toussaint
- Alex Verdugo

=== 2014 ===
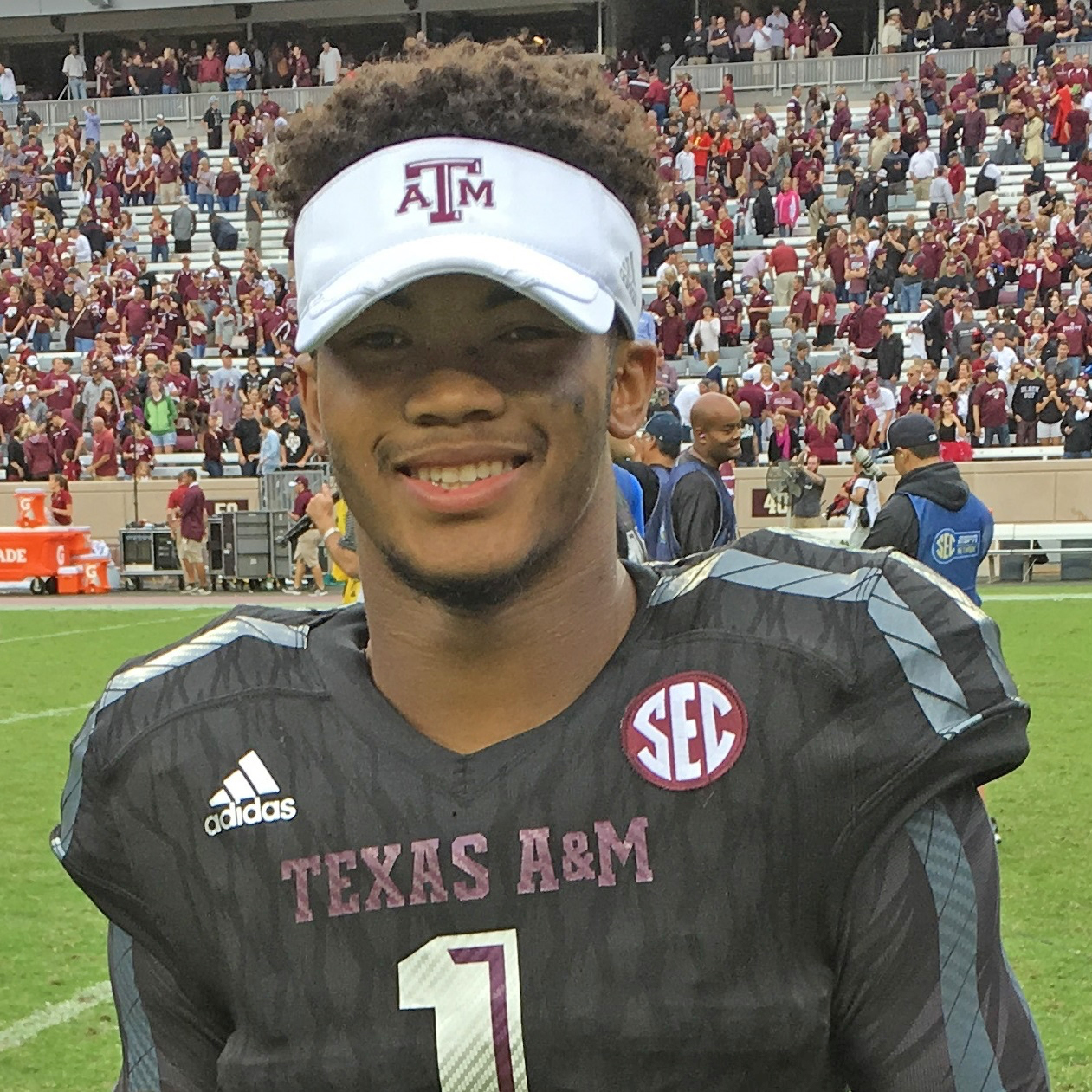
2014 alumnus Kyler Murray with the Texas A&M Aggies in 2015

- Luken Baker
- Seth Beer
- Beau Burrows
- Daz Cameron
- Kody Clemens
- Gray Fenter
- Ke'Bryan Hayes
- Ryan Mountcastle
- Kyler Murray
- Josh Naylor
- Mike Nikorak
- Demi Orimoloye
- Nick Plummer
- Cal Raleigh
- Austin Riley
- Brendan Rodgers
- Ashe Russell
- Cole Sands
- Nick Shumpert
- Kyle Tucker

=== 2015 ===
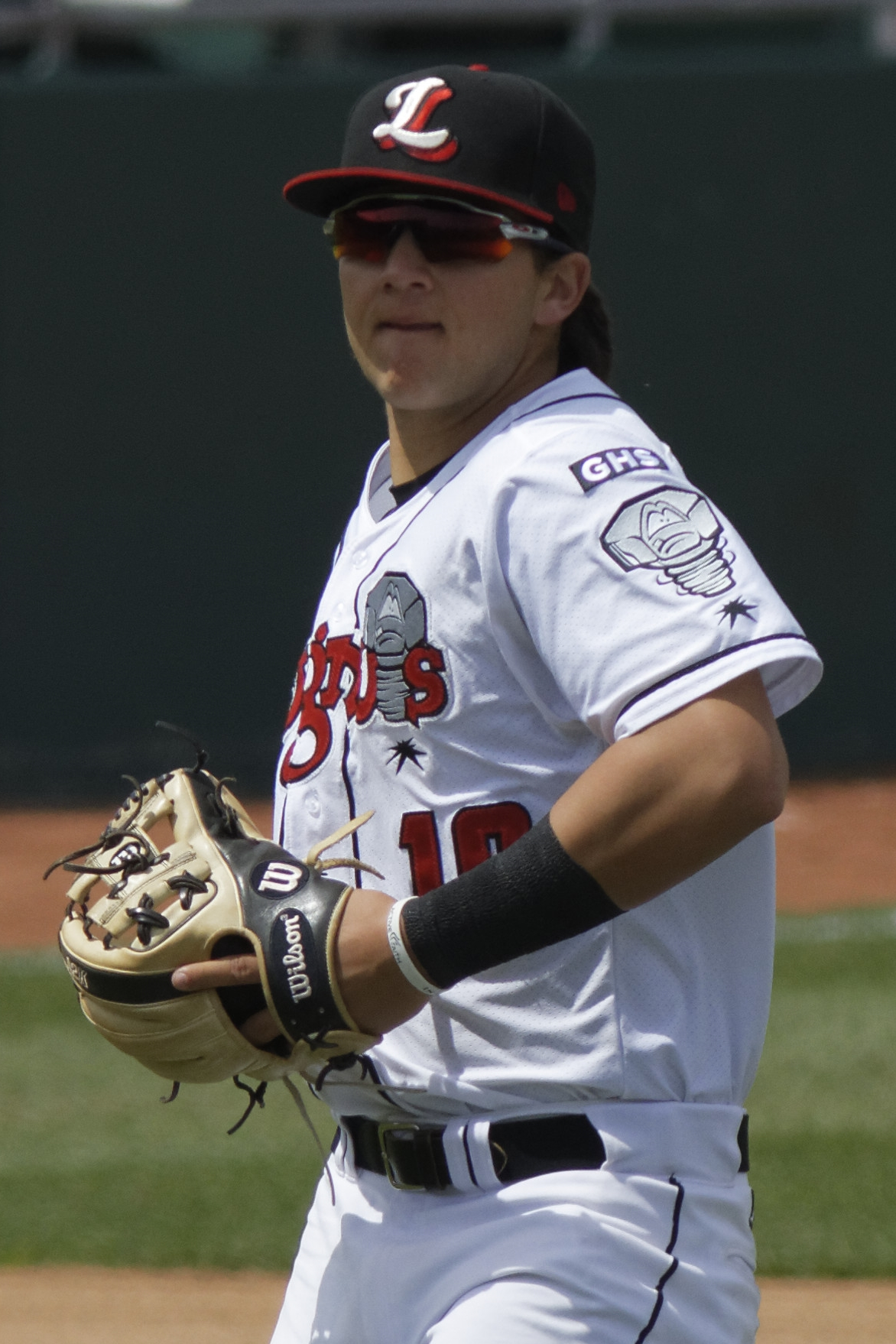
2015 alumnus Bo Bichette with the Lansing Lugnuts in 2017

- Jo Adell
- Seth Beer
- Will Benson
- Bo Bichette
- Hunter Bishop
- A. J. Brown
- Dylan Carlson
- Thomas Dillard
- Grae Kessinger
- Carter Kieboom
- Jesús Luzardo
- Alek Manoah
- Kyle Muller
- Delvin Pérez
- Riley Pint
- Graeme Stinson
- Taylor Trammell
- Colton Welker
- Joey Wentz
- Forrest Whitley
- Andy Yerzy

=== 2016 ===
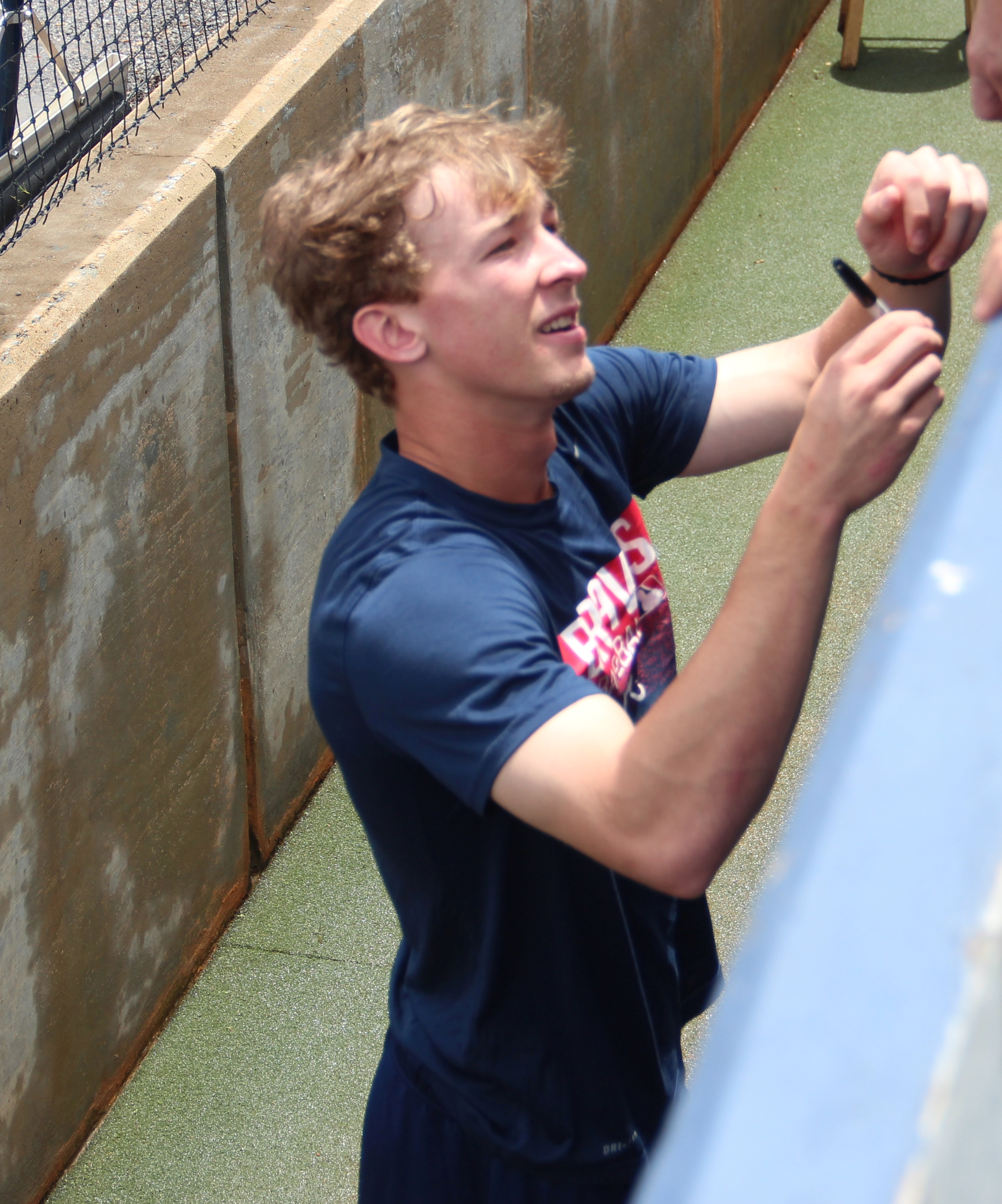
2016 alumnus Drew Waters with the Rome Braves in 2018

- Jo Adell
- Nick Allen
- Shane Baz
- Joe Boyle
- Tanner Burns
- Triston Casas
- Hans Crouse
- Hagen Danner
- Jake Eder
- Hunter Greene
- DL Hall
- Royce Lewis
- MJ Melendez
- Garrett Mitchell
- Nick Pratto
- Heliot Ramos
- Ryan Vilade
- Drew Waters

=== 2017 ===
- Jordyn Adams
- Blaze Alexander
- Triston Casas
- Slade Cecconi
- Chandler Champlain
- Mason Denaburg
- J. T. Ginn
- Nolan Gorman
- Jordan Groshans
- Ethan Hankins
- Jaden Hill
- Rece Hinds
- Jeremiah Jackson
- Jarred Kelenic
- Matthew Liberatore
- Noah "Bo" Naylor
- Kumar Rocker
- Mike Siani
- Alek Thomas
- Ryan Weathers
- Cole Wilcox
- Cole Winn

=== 2018 ===
- C. J. Abrams
- Matthew Allan
- Hunter Barco
- Tyler Callihan
- Corbin Carroll
- Daniel Espino
- Jud Fabian
- Riley Greene
- Gunnar Henderson
- Rece Hinds
- Jared Jones
- Spencer Jones
- Jack Leiter
- Tyler Locklear
- Brennan Malone
- Quinn Priester
- Matthew Thompson
- Anthony Volpe
- Bobby Witt Jr.
- Carter Young

=== 2019 ===
- Dylan Crews
- Pete Crow-Armstrong
- Robert Hassell
- Austin Hendrick
- Ed Howard
- Jared Jones
- Blaze Jordan
- Kyle Karros
- Jared Kelley
- Christian Little
- Coby Mayo
- Robert Moore
- Yohandy Morales
- Andrew Painter
- Max Rajcic
- Drew Romo
- Nate Savino
- Nolan McLean
- Will Sanders
- Daniel Susac
- Zac Veen
- Cayden Wallace
- Tanner Witt

== See also ==
- Baseball awards#U.S. high-school baseball
