= Ty Hensley =

American baseball player (born 1993)

- Pitcher
- Born: July 30, 1993 (age 33); Edmond, Oklahoma, U.S.
- Bats: Switch Throws: Right
- Stats at Baseball Reference

Michael Tyler Hensley (born July 30, 1993) is an American former professional baseball pitcher. Hensley was a first round selection of the New York Yankees in the 2012 Major League Baseball draft, but never played in the major leagues after playing only five professional seasons (two with the Yankees).

== Early life and amateur career ==
Hensley lived in Tulsa, Oklahoma, before his family moved to Lawrence, Kansas. He was set to attend Lawrence Free State High School. However, strict rules about how many games he could play for the high school baseball team led the family to move to Oklahoma, which allows for a longer high school baseball schedule. He attended Edmond Santa Fe High School in Edmond, Oklahoma, where he played for the baseball team as a pitcher and catcher and for the American football team as a quarterback. Hensley stopped playing football as a senior in order to focus on baseball. In his senior year, Hensley compiled a 10–0 win–loss record, a 1.52 earned run average (ERA) in 55 1/3 innings pitched with 111 strikeouts and was named the Gatorade Player of the Year for his state.

Hensley was recruited by numerous college baseball programs, and the University of Kansas recruited him to play college baseball and college football. He narrowed down his choices to three finalists: the University of Mississippi (Ole Miss), the University of Texas, and Arizona State University. After spending the summer of 2011 playing for the United States 18-and-under national baseball team with Gavin Cecchini and Stryker Trahan, who had committed to Ole Miss to play for the Ole Miss Rebels baseball team, Hensley also chose to commit to Ole Miss.

== Professional career ==
=== New York Yankees ===
The New York Yankees selected Hensley in the first round, with the 30th overall selection, of the 2012 Major League Baseball draft. Though the Yankees and Hensley agreed on a $1.6 million signing bonus, a physical examination discovered an abnormality in the shoulder of his pitching arm. As a result, the Yankees reduced the offered bonus to $1.2 million; Hensley agreed to the reduced bonus and signed with the Yankees rather than attend Ole Miss.

After signing, Hensley made his professional debut in Minor League Baseball with the Gulf Coast Yankees of the Rookie-level Gulf Coast League. He pitched 12 innings for the Gulf Coast Yankees, striking out 14. He suffered an abdominal muscle strain while pitching in the Dominican Republic during the offseason. Though he rehabilitated the injury, he felt pain in his hip during spring training in 2013, which was diagnosed as a hip impingement. He required surgery to repair both hip labrums. He developed an infection from the surgeries, and had an allergic reaction to the antibiotics he was prescribed. Hensley missed the entire 2013 season. He required a minor abdominal surgery to reattach the muscle to the bone before the 2014 season, and pitched for the Gulf Coast Yankees and the Staten Island Yankees of the Class A-Short Season New York–Penn League in 2014. Between the two levels, he had a 2.93 ERA and 40 strikeouts in 30 2/3 innings pitched across 11 appearances.

Hensley began experiencing discomfort in his arm during spring training in 2015. An MRI and arthrogram found a bone calcification inside a torn ulnar collateral ligament of the elbow. He underwent Tommy John surgery and missed the 2015 season. While rehabilitating, the Yankees announced that Hensley would need a second Tommy John surgery in May 2016. He missed the 2015 and 2016 seasons due to injury.

On December 8, 2016, at the Winter Meetings, the Tampa Bay Rays selected Hensley from the Yankees in the minor league phase of the Rule 5 draft. He missed the 2017 season after a screw had to be inserted to reconnect the bone in his elbow. The Rays released Hensley on April 24, 2018.

=== Evansville Otters ===
Hensley signed with the Evansville Otters of the Frontier League, an independent baseball league, in May 2018. With Evansville, he pitched to a 6.61 ERA with 31 strikeouts and 41 walks in 11 appearances.

=== Utica Unicorns ===
In 2019, Hensley pitched for the Utica Unicorns of the United Shore Professional Baseball League. On August 6, 2020, Hensley threw a no-hitter for Utica against the Eastside Diamond Hoppers.

On January 28, 2021, Hensley signed with the Milwaukee Milkmen of the American Association. Hensley did not make an appearance for Milwaukee before he was released by the team on August 27.

== Personal life ==
Hensley's father, Mike, played for college baseball for the Oklahoma Sooners and for the St. Louis Cardinals' organization in Minor League Baseball. After Mike's career ended due to an injury, he worked as a pitching coach for Oral Roberts University and Kansas State University. Hensley has a brother, J. R., who also pitches and plays left tackle for the football team.

Following the 2014 season, Hensley was assaulted and seriously injured in a town near his home. Anthony Morales, an American football linebacker who played college football for Weber State University, allegedly attacked Hensley, kicking him in the head, when they argued about signing bonuses, and Hensley refused to tell Morales how much he received in his signing bonus. Hensley lost consciousness and suffered a broken jaw. He spent several days at INTEGRIS Southwest Medical Center. Morales was charged with aggravated assault and battery, but later acquitted of the crimes.

== See also ==
- Rule 5 draft results
