= Dominick McKinley =

American football player

No. 96 – LSU Tigers
- Position: Defensive tackle
- Class: Junior

Personal information
- Listed height: 6 ft 6 in (1.98 m)
- Listed weight: 297 lb (135 kg)

Career information
- High school: Acadiana (Scott, Louisiana)
- College: LSU (2024–present)

Dominick McKinley is an American college football defensive tackle for the LSU Tigers.

== Early life ==
McKinley is from Lafayette, Louisiana. He has a brother, Darryus, who also plays as a defensive tackle and committed to play for the LSU Tigers. McKinley attended Acadiana High School where he became a top defensive tackle. He posted 86 tackles, 18 tackles-for-loss (TFLs) and 10 sacks during his junior year. He also had two interceptions and scored two touchdowns. McKinley then tallied 71 tackles and 11 TFLs as a senior in 2023, earning first-team 5A all-state honors while helping Acadiana to the state championship. A five-star recruit, he was ranked a top-20 prospect nationally in the class of 2024. He initially committed to play college football for the Texas A&M Aggies before flipping his commitment to the LSU Tigers.

== College career ==
As a true freshman at LSU in 2024, McKinley appeared in 10 games and tallied seven tackles, three tackles-for-loss and three sacks, with two of his sacks coming in a game against the Oklahoma Sooners. He was named the Southeastern Conference (SEC) Freshman of the Week for his performance against Oklahoma. Entering his sophomore year, he was named to Bruce Feldman of The Athletic's "Freaks List", highlighting the most athletic college football players. In 2025, McKinley recorded 12 tackles and a sack. He announced a return to the Tigers for the 2026 season.
