= Anthony Morales =

American football player (born 1990)

No. 46
- Position: Linebacker

Personal information
- Born: August 27, 1990 (age 36); Edmond, Oklahoma, U.S.
- Listed height: 5 ft 10 in (1.78 m)
- Listed weight: 230 lb (104 kg)

Career information
- High school: Edmond Memorial
- College: Weber State University
- NFL draft: 2014: undrafted

Career history
- Carolina Panthers (2014)

Anthony Morales (born August 27, 1990) is an American former football linebacker. Morales played college football at Weber State University from 2009 to 2013. Morales was signed by the Carolina Panthers on July 24, 2014, and was subsequently waived on August 25, 2014.

== College career ==
Morales attended Weber State University, starting in 2009 and finished his collegiate career in 2013. He sat out the 2009 season as a red shirt in February 2009. In 2010, he played 10 games as a Redshirt Freshman and started in one game. He recorded 19 total tackles during the 2010 season. As a sophomore in 2011, he started in 11 games for the Wildcats receiving an Honorable Mention in the Big Sky All-Conference honors at linebacker, he record 115 total tackles during his 2011 sophomore season. As a Junior in 2012, Morales served as one of the team captains and started in 9 of the 11 games during the season. He earned Second-team Big Sky All-Conference honors at linebacker totaling 108 tackles for the season. In the 2013 Senior year, Morals was named to the Big Sky All-Conference Third-team recording 100 total tackles in his final year of eligibility. He finished his career at Weber State as one of the top linebackers in school history. He served as a defensive captain for three-strait years, playing in 40 career games and totaling 342 career tackles which rank fifth in school history.

== Professional career ==
Morales was signed by the Carolina Panthers on July 24, 2014. After Morales signed his two-year contract with the Carolina Panthers he stated "I'm on the 90-man roster and I've got to make the cut, so I'll be in the preseason games and then after the third one, they do the cut to 55 and then after the last game, they go down to 53," Morales said."[The Panthers] have 10 linebackers, including myself."It was weird because I was actually enrolling into Weber (on Tuesday) and then my agent called me and said, 'Pack up, you're a Carolina Panther.' It was kind of ironic; I still have two classes left to graduate, so I was just going to go back to Weber for this semester.". Morales played in a preseason game during the 2014 season. He was subsequently waived on August 25, 2014.

== Personal life ==
On January 8, 2015, Morales was charged with aggravated assault and battery for allegedly breaking the jaw of Yankees pitching prospect Ty Hensley in what was described by Oklahoma authorities as an argument about signing bonuses. The alleged incident occurred on December 28, 2014, in which the charging document filed by the Oklahoma County District Attorney's Office says Morales repeatedly kicked Hensley in the face "resulting in a fractured jaw and broken teeth" at a home near Oklahoma City. Morales states that he was simply acting in self-defense.
