= Kenneth George Jr. =

American gridiron football player (born 1997)

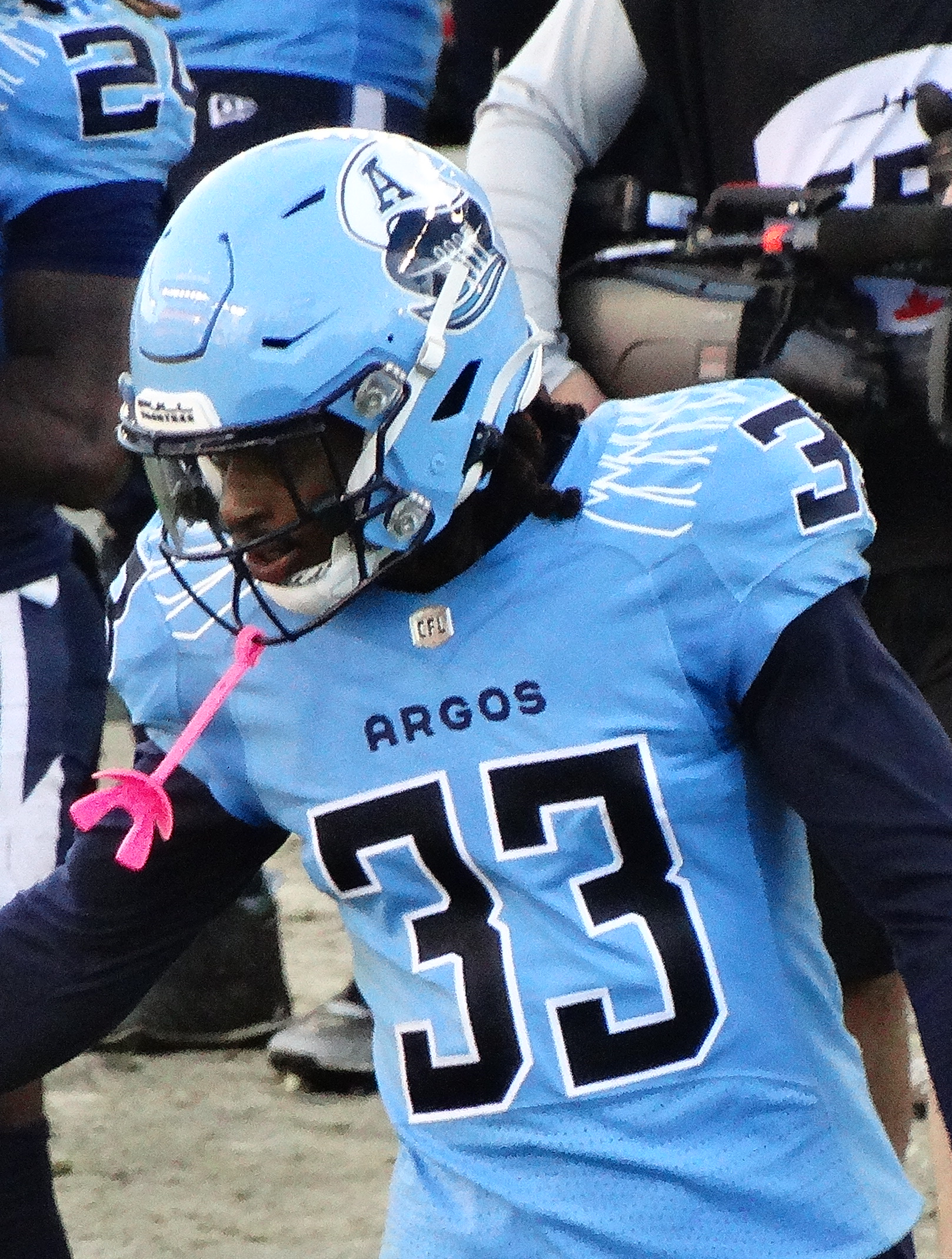
- George with the Toronto Argonauts in 2024

Profile
- Position: Defensive back

Personal information
- Born: March 14, 1997 (age 29); Lafayette, Louisiana, U.S.
- Listed height: 5 ft 11 in (1.80 m)
- Listed weight: 203 lb (92 kg)

Career information
- High school: Acadiana (Lafayette)
- College: Trinity Valley (2016–2017); Tennessee (2018–2021)
- NFL draft: 2022: undrafted

Career history
- 2022: Tennessee Titans*
- 2023: Houston Roughnecks
- 2023–2024: Hamilton Tiger-Cats
- 2024–2025: Toronto Argonauts
- * Offseason or practice squad member only

Awards and highlights
- Grey Cup champion (2024)
- Stats at CFL.ca

Kenneth George Jr. (born March 14, 1997) is an American professional football defensive back. He most recently played for the Toronto Argonauts of the Canadian Football League (CFL). He played college football at Trinity Valley Community College and Tennessee. He has also been a member of the Tennessee Titans of the National Football League (NFL) and the Houston Roughnecks of the XFL.

== Early life ==
George played high school football at Acadiana High School in Lafayette, Louisiana.

== College career ==
After high school, George gained 50 pounds and grew five inches becoming a walk-on at Trinity Valley Community College. He was redshirted in 2016. He played in 11 games in 2017, recording 27 tackles and two interceptions.

George transferred to play college football at Tennessee from 2018 to 2021. He played in the first four games of the 2018 season, totaling three tackles, before suffering a season-ending injury. In August 2019, he was sentenced to one year of probation after pleading guilty to battery of a police officer and resisting an officer without violence. George appeared in 13 games, starting six, in 2019, accumulating 19 tackles, one interception and three pass breakups. He played in eight games, starting four, in 2020, recording 25 tackles and six pass breakups. He played in eight games in 2021, totaling five tackles.

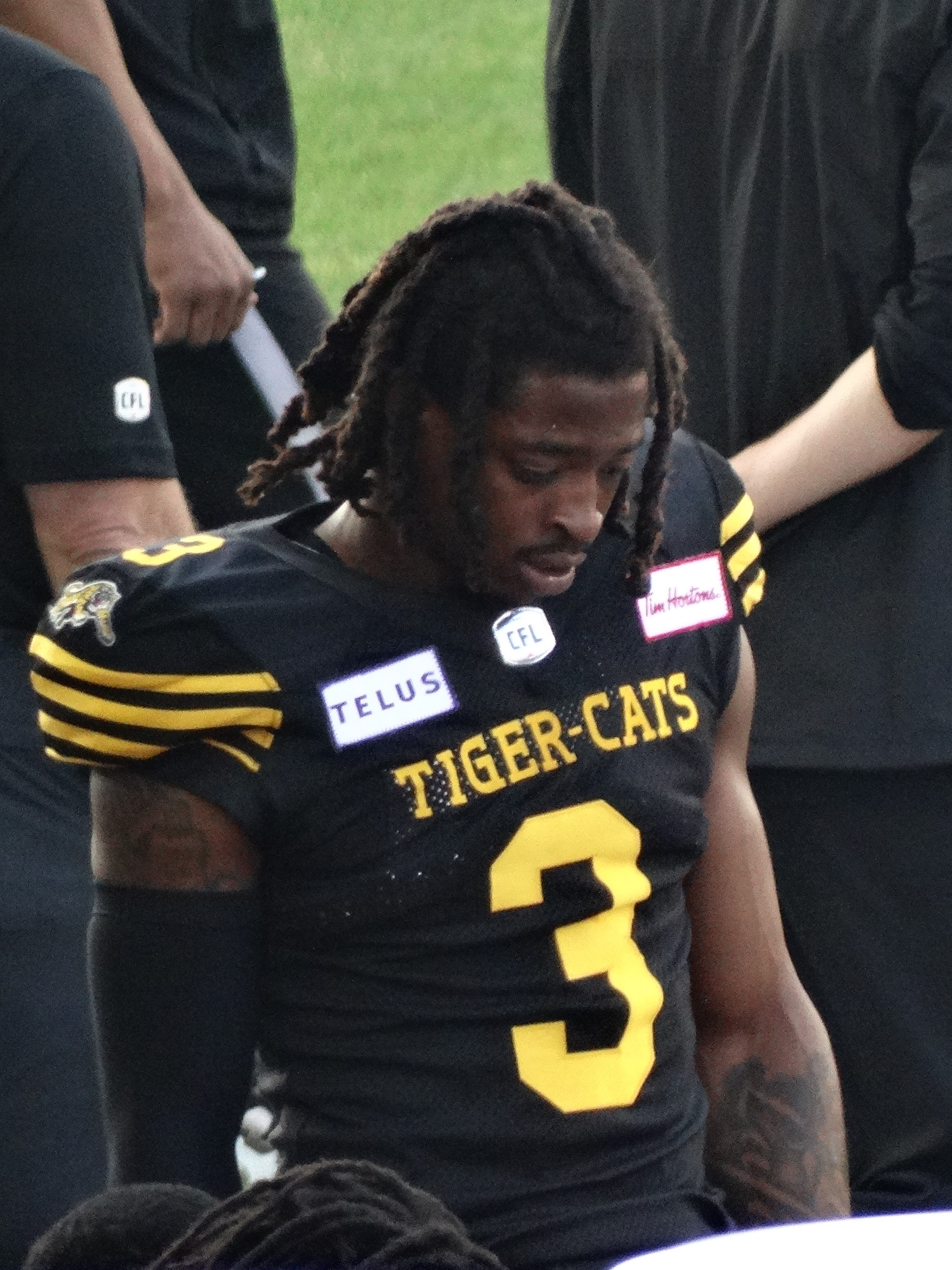
George with the Hamilton Tiger-Cats in 2013

== Professional career ==
=== Tennessee Titans ===
George signed with the Tennessee Titans of the National Football League (NFL) on May 16, 2022. He was released on August 9, 2022.

=== Houston Roughnecks ===
George was signed by the Houston Roughnecks of the XFL on January 6, 2023.

=== Hamilton Tiger-Cats ===
George signed with the Hamilton Tiger-Cats of the Canadian Football League (CFL) on February 21, 2023. He started 18 games for the Tiger-Cats in 2023, recording 43 tackles on defense, one sack, two interceptions and one forced fumble. In 2024, he played in 10 regular season games where he had 39 defensive tackles, two interceptions, and one interception for a touchdown before being released on August 20, 2024.

=== Toronto Argonauts ===
On August 28, 2024, it was announced that George had signed with the Toronto Argonauts of the CFL. He played in the last four games of the regular season, starting in one, here he had four defensive tackles, five special teams tackles, and two pass knockdowns. He also played in the East Semi-Final as a backup before being moved to the practice roster for the East Final. He was on the injured list when the Argonauts defeated the Winnipeg Blue Bombers in the 111th Grey Cup.

George played in just two regular season games in 2025 and became a free agent upon the expiry of his contract on February 10, 2026.
