= Demi Orimoloye =

Canadian baseball player (born 1997)

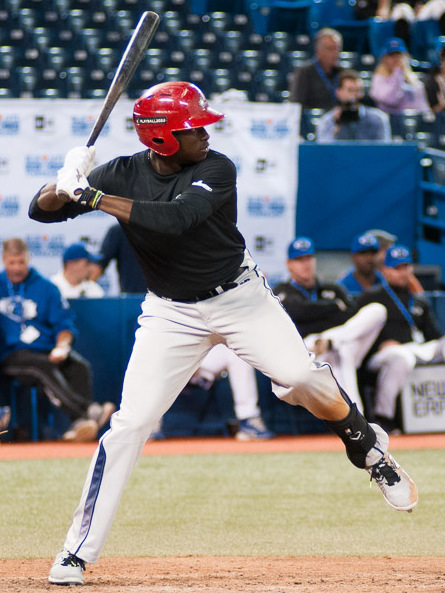
- Orimoloye at Rogers Centre in 2014
- Outfielder
- Born: January 6, 1997 (age 29); Lagos, Nigeria
- Bats: Right Throws: Right
- Stats at Baseball Reference

Oluwademilade "Demi" Orimoloye (born January 6, 1997) is a Nigerian-Canadian former professional baseball outfielder. He attended St. Matthew Catholic High School in Ottawa, and was considered a top prospect in the 2015 Major League Baseball draft. The Milwaukee Brewers selected Orimoloye in the fourth round, and traded him to the Toronto Blue Jays in 2018.

== Early life ==
Orimoloye was born to Adenike and Segun Orimoloye in Nigeria. His father, Segun, is an architect, and both of his parents worked for the Nigerian government. Demi has a younger brother, Temi. The family moved to Canada when Demi was eighteen months old, and live in Orleans, Ontario. As a child, he played volleyball and basketball.

== Baseball career ==
Orimoloye began playing Little League Baseball at the age of 10. He attended St. Matthew Catholic High School in Ottawa. He joined for the Canadian junior national baseball team when he was 15 years old. In 2014, he traveled with the national baseball team to Orlando, Florida, Cuba, and the Dominican Republic. He appeared in the Under Armour All-America Baseball Game, which is held for the 40 best high school baseball prospects. In February 2015, Orimoloye was named a High School All-American by Baseball America. He was also named the Most Valuable Player at the 2015 Area Code Games.

=== Milwaukee Brewers ===
Orimoloye committed to attend the University of Oregon to play college baseball for the Oregon Ducks baseball team. He was eligible to be selected in the 2015 Major League Baseball draft, and has been ranked among the 50 best prospects available in the draft by Baseball America and Perfect Game. The Milwaukee Brewers selected Orimoloye in the fourth round, with the 121st overall selection, of the draft. He signed with the Brewers, reportedly receiving a $450,000 signing bonus, and reported to the Arizona Brewers of the Rookie-level Arizona League to begin his professional career; in Arizona, Orimoloye posted a .292 batting average with six home runs and 26 RBIs. Orimoloye spent 2016 with the Helena Brewers of the Advanced Rookie-level Pioneer League, where he batted .205 with five home runs and 17 RBIs. He spent the 2017 season with the Wisconsin Timber Rattlers of the Single-A Midwest League, posting a .214 batting average with 11 home runs, 45 RBIs, and 38 stolen bases in 125 games. In 2018, Orimoloye began the year with the Carolina Mudcats of the High-A Carolina League, and hit .248/.322/.393 in 126 games for Wisconsin and Carolina.

=== Toronto Blue Jays ===
On August 31, 2018, the Brewers traded Orimoloye to the Toronto Blue Jays for Curtis Granderson. In 2019, he spent the year with the High-A Dunedin Blue Jays, slashing .240/.292/.386 with 12 home runs and 64 RBI across 113 games. Orimoloye did not play in a game in 2020 due to the cancellation of the minor league season because of the COVID-19 pandemic. Orimoloye spent the 2021 season with the Double-A New Hampshire Fisher Cats, batting .237/.268/.368 with 6 home runs and 20 RBI in 75 contests. He elected minor league free agency following the season on November 7, 2021.

== Playing style ==
Orimoloye is 6 feet 4 inches (1.93 m) tall and weighs 225 pounds (102 kg). Greg Hamilton, coach of the Canadian junior team, has called Orimoloye a "special athlete", who "looks like a kid who’d normally be going to the University of Texas to play tight end".
