= Clem Spillane Field =

Sports venue in Wareham, Massachusetts, US

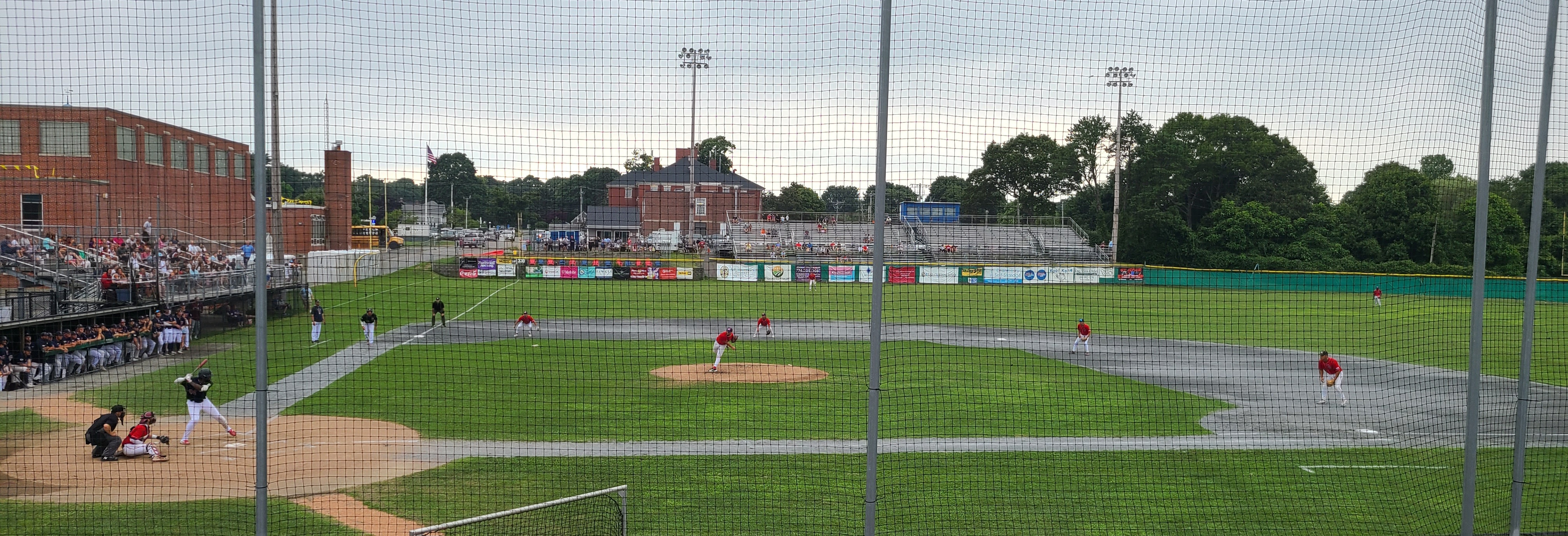
- Interactive map of Clem Spillane Field
- Address: 54 Marion Road at Viking Drive
- Location: Wareham, Massachusetts
- Coordinates: 41°45′28.88″N 70°43′19.77″W
- Capacity: 3,000
- Surface: Grass
- Field size: Left Field: 325 ft Center Field: 400 ft Right Field: 330 ft

Tenant
- Wareham Gatemen

Clem Spillane Field is a baseball and football venue in Wareham, Massachusetts, home to the Wareham Gatemen of the Cape Cod Baseball League (CCBL). Wareham High School is located to the southeast of the field.

Spillane Field is named for longtime Wareham High teacher and coach Clement S. Spillane. A graduate of Oliver Ames High School in Easton, Massachusetts, Spillane came to Wareham in 1947 and coached football, basketball and baseball. In 13 years at Wareham, Spillane's teams never posted a losing record, and claimed multiple league and regional titles. Spillane is enshrined in the Massachusetts coaches' halls of fame for each of the three sports he coached.

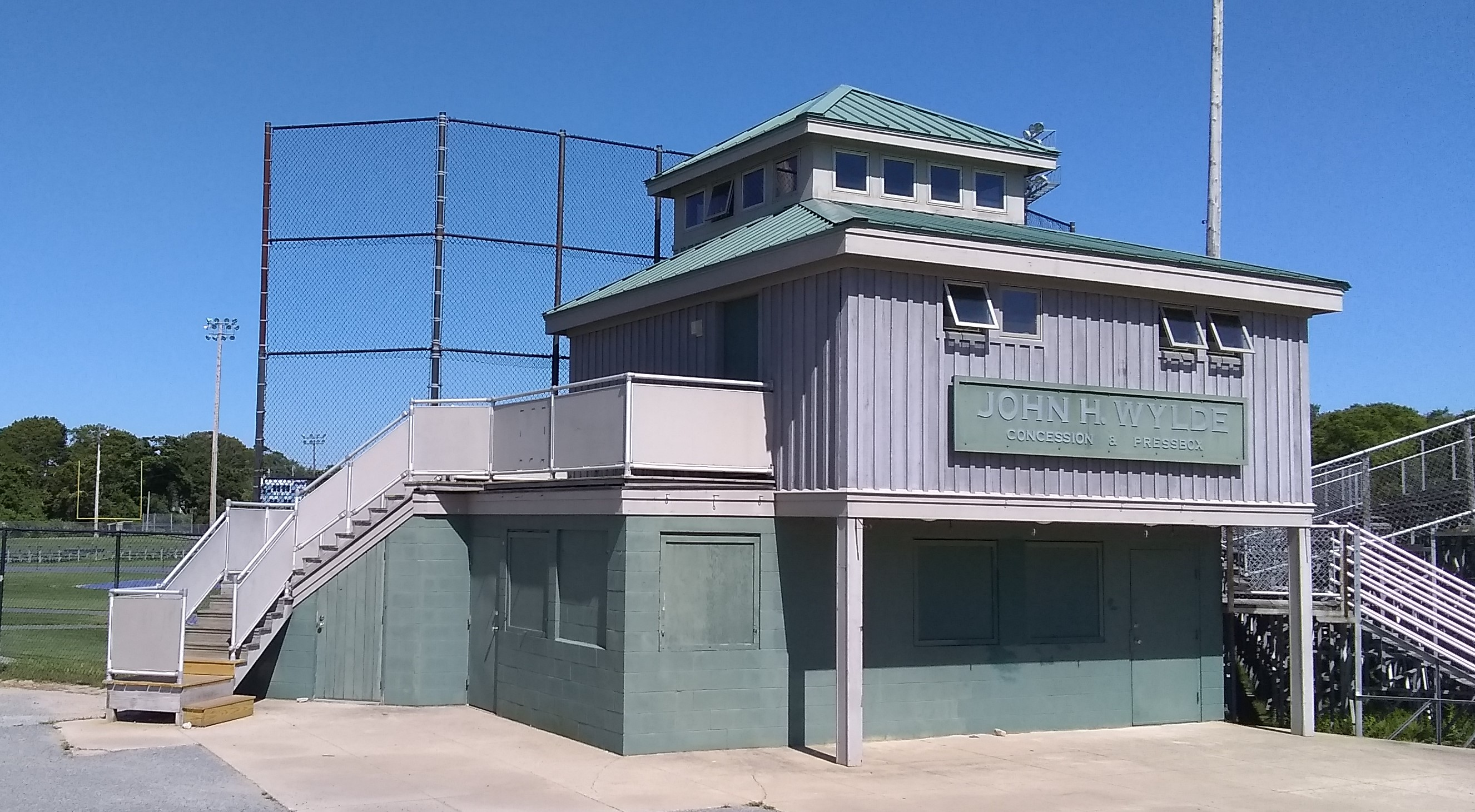
John H. Wylde concession & pressbox

The field is a multipurpose facility, used for both baseball and football. A pressbox and concession stand is located behind home plate, and large sections of bleachers along the first and third base lines and left field fence provide abundant seating. A 2007 grant from the Yawkey Foundation allowed for major improvements in the field's playing surface, irrigation, and security. A major renovation was completed in 2025 to improve the playing field and seating areas.

The CCBL's Gatemen began play at Spillane Field in the 1960s. The field hosted the league's all-star game in 1965, 1993, 1995, 2007, 2015, 2017, and 2022, and has seen the Gatemen claim eight CCBL championships, most recently in 2018. The ballpark has been the summertime home of dozens of future major leaguers such as Lance Berkman, Kyle Schwarber, and George Springer.

From 2005 through 2007, each July the field hosted an annual Cape Cod High School Baseball Classic, an all-star baseball game for high school upperclassmen.

== See also ==
- Cape Cod Baseball League
- Wareham Gatemen
