= Jacob Cutrera =

American football player (born 1988)

No. 58, 51
- Position: Linebacker

Personal information
- Born: May 18, 1988 (age 38); Lafayette, Louisiana, U.S.
- Listed height: 6 ft 3 in (1.91 m)
- Listed weight: 238 lb (108 kg)

Career information
- High school: Acadiana (Scott, Louisiana)
- College: Louisiana State
- NFL draft: 2010: undrafted

Career history
- Jacksonville Jaguars (2010); Tampa Bay Buccaneers (2011–2013)

Awards and highlights
- BCS national champion (2007)

Career NFL statistics
- Total tackles: 10
- Forced fumbles: 1
- Stats at Pro Football Reference

Jacob Arnie Cutrera is an American former professional football player who was a linebacker in the National Football League (NFL). He played college football for the LSU Tigers and was signed by the Jacksonville Jaguars as an undrafted free agent in 2010.

== Professional career ==
=== Jacksonville Jaguars ===
Cutrera was signed as an undrafted free agent by the Jacksonville Jaguars after the 2010 NFL draft. Cutrera and two other undrafted free agents made the Jaguars' opening day roster.

=== Tampa Bay Buccaneers ===
On October 11, 2011, he was signed off the Jaguars' practice squad by the Tampa Bay Buccaneers. He was released by the Buccaneers on August 27, 2013.

== Personal life ==
He resides in Lafayette, Louisiana. He attended Acadiana High School in Lafayette, Louisiana.
