= Cody Mandell =

American football player (born 1992)

Profile
- Position: Punter

Personal information
- Born: April 7, 1992 (age 34); Lafayette, Louisiana, U.S.
- Listed height: 6 ft 2 in (1.88 m)
- Listed weight: 217 lb (98 kg)

Career information
- High school: Acadiana (Lafayette)
- College: Alabama
- NFL draft: 2014: undrafted

Career history
- Dallas Cowboys (2014)*; Green Bay Packers (2015)*; Hamilton Tiger-Cats (2016)*; Louisiana VooDoo (2024)
- * Offseason or practice squad member only

Awards and highlights
- 2× BCS national champion (2012, 2013); First-team All-SEC (2013)

Cody Mandell (born April 7, 1992) is an American former football punter. He played college football at Alabama.

== Early life ==
Mandell attended Acadiana High School and was recruited to Alabama to walk-on the team as a punter. During his career with the Crimson Tide, Mandell started all four years and was a member of both the 2011 and 2012 national championship teams. During his four years at Alabama, he increased his punting average from 39.2 yards as a freshman to 47.1 yards by his senior year.

== Professional career ==
After his senior year at Alabama, Mandell was selected to participate in the NFL Scouting Combine as one of the top punters in the 2014 draft class. Mandell went undrafted in the 2014 NFL draft, but was signed as an undrafted free agent by the Dallas Cowboys after the draft. He was released on August 12, 2014.

On January 26, 2015, it was announced by Green Bay Packers General Manager Ted Thompson that they signed Mandell and that he would wear number 9 for the Packers. He was released from the team on August 10, 2015.

On May 30, 2016, it was reported that Mandell had signed with the Hamilton Tiger-Cats of the Canadian Football League. He was released on June 19, 2016, before the start of the regular season.

Mandell played for the Louisiana VooDoo of the new Arena Football League in 2024.
