= Graeme Stinson =

American baseball player (born 1997)

- Pitcher
- Born: August 6, 1997 (age 28); Atlanta, Georgia, U.S.
- Bats: Left Throws: Left
- Stats at Baseball Reference

Graeme Wilder Stinson (born August 6, 1997) is an American former professional baseball pitcher.

== Amateur career ==
Stinson attended Norcross High School in Norcross, Georgia, where he played on the school's varsity baseball team all four years. In 2015, the summer before his senior year, he played in the Under Armour All-America Baseball Game at Wrigley Field. As a senior, he pitched to a 7–0 record with a 1.88 ERA in 44 2/3 innings.

Undrafted out of high school in the 2016 Major League Baseball draft, Stinson played college baseball for the Duke Blue Devils. As a freshman at Duke in 2017, Stinson struggled, posting a 3–1 record with a 6.67 ERA in 12 games (nine starts), although he did strike out 45 batters in 28 1/3 innings pitched. He played for the Orleans Firebirds of the Cape Cod Baseball League that summer, pitching to a 2.45 ERA in 18 1/3 innings. Stinson broke out as a sophomore in 2018, going 5–1 with a 1.89 ERA, striking out 98 batters in 62 innings while only walking 19 in 23 games (four starts). After the season, he once again returned to the Cape Cod League along with playing for the United States national collegiate team. Prior to the 2019 season, he was named a Preseason All-American by D1Baseball, Collegiate Baseball, and Perfect Game. Stinson was considered one of the top prospects for the 2019 Major League Baseball draft, but his stock fell after he missed nearly all of the 2019 season due to injury, compiling a 4.58 ERA in five starts on the year.

== Professional career ==
Stinson was selected by the Tampa Bay Rays in the fourth round with the 128th overall pick of the 2019 Major League Baseball draft and signed for $444,400. He made his professional debut with the Rookie-level Gulf Coast League Rays, appearing in one game. Stinson did not play in a game in 2020 due to the cancellation of the minor league season because of the COVID-19 pandemic. For the 2021 season, Stinson was assigned to the Charleston RiverDogs of the Low-A East, going 2–0 with a 5.55 ERA and 39 strikeouts over 48 2/3 innings.

Stinson opened the 2022 season with the Bowling Green Hot Rods of the High-A South Atlantic League. In late July, he was promoted to the Montgomery Biscuits of the Double-A Southern League, was demoted back to Bowling Green in early August, and was promoted back to Montgomery near the season's end. Over 40 relief appearances between the two teams, he went 5–2 with a 4.26 ERA, 84 strikeouts, and 30 walks over 63 1/3 innings. He split 2023 with Bowling Green and Montgomery. Stinson was not on Rays organizational roster in 2024 and did not play in the minors in 2024 or 2025.
