= Union High School (Camas, Washington) =

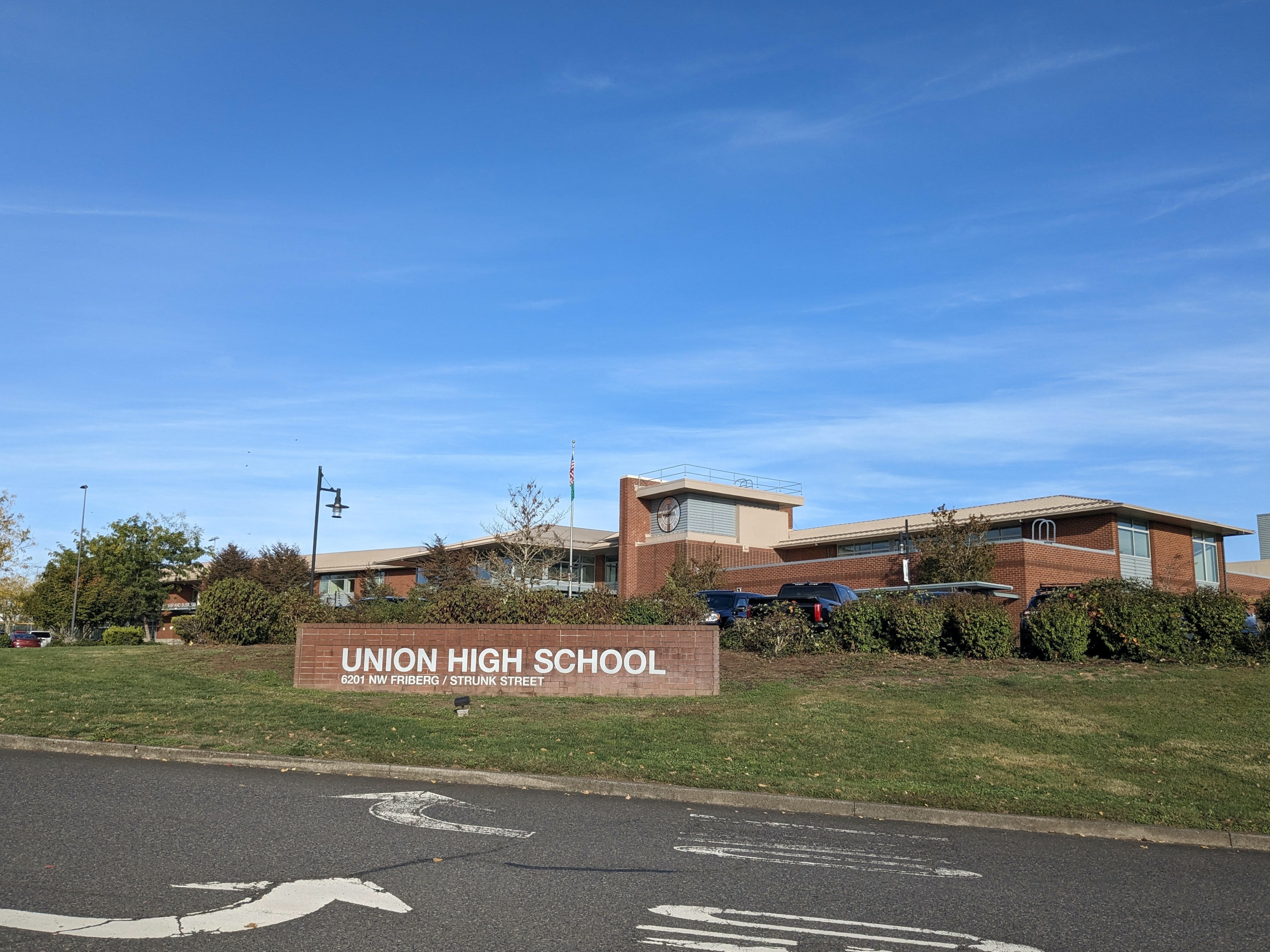

Location
- 6201 NW Friberg-Strunk Street; Camas, Washington; United States; 45°37′25″N 122°28′8″W

Information
- Type: Public
- Motto: "Reach Higher"
- Established: 2007
- School district: Evergreen Public School District
- Principal: Gregg Brown
- Teaching staff: 85.10 (FTE)
- Enrollment: 2,021 (2022-2023)
- Student to teacher ratio: 23.75
- Colors: Silver, black and red
- Athletics conference: 4A
- Mascot: Titan
- Nickname: "The Dark Side"
- Rivals: Camas High School
- Website: sites.google.com/evergreenps.org/union

Union High School (UHS) is an American public high school in Vancouver, Washington. It is part of the Evergreen Public Schools school district. While the campus is located within the proper city limits of Vancouver, it has a Camas area zip code.

== History ==
Union opened in the fall of 2007 with students consisting of only freshmen, sophomores, and a handful of juniors. The original Union High School was founded in 1910. James Blair was the first principal.

It is the fourth and newest high school built in the Evergreen School District. The four high schools share one football stadium, McKenzie Stadium, which is adjacent to Evergreen High School.

The school and campus were developed with the concept of utilizing contemporary educational technology. The design collaboration for the school won it a 2007 Community Development Department Community Pride Design award.

In June 2010 Newsweek magazine listed Union High School in its annual list of “America’s Best High Schools,” which includes 1,600, or about 6 percent, of the nation's high schools. UHS was listed 572nd nationally and 8th out of 32 high schools listed in the state of Washington.

== Athletics ==
The Union football team is one of the school's most prominent athletic teams. They had a record of 6-3 in their first year without seniors. In 2008, the undefeated Titans lost to Bellevue High School in the 3A state championship game. The Titans won 3A GSHL league titles in 2008, and 2009. The Titans earned 2nd place 4A GSHL titles in 2010, 2011, 2012 and 2013 and finished 1st in 2017 and 2018. In 2018 the undefeated Titans beat Lake Stevens High School 52-20 in the 4A state championship, receiving their first state title in football.

Union's wrestling team are five-time Clark County champions, five-time GSHL league champions, six-time district champions, and three-time regional champions. In 2011, Titan wrestling took the team title at the prestigious Pacific Coast Championships, and in 2012 and 2014 they won state trophies, placing 4th and 3rd respectively. Union's individual state champions include Clint Coulter (2010), John "Junior" Godinho (2014), Alex Berfanger (2014) and two-time state champs Dan Snediker and Ethan Rowton.

== Campus ==
The Union High School Campus has five different site-built buildings which house the four different academic academies and the Student Commons, and a large modular unit. The five campus buildings are the Leadership and Business building (100), the Engineering and Environmental Sciences building (200), International Studies and Athletics building (300), the Visual and Performing Arts building (400), and the Student Union (500). The last building (600) is a multi-use building housing such programs as American Sign Language and Dance. Each building excluding the Student Union contains the basic core classes including math, general science, and English. Each building also contains specialty classes specific to that building.

Every classroom throughout all the buildings has a common set of technology resources installed, including a video projector, a document camera, and speech amplification system for teachers.

Union High School also features wireless hot spots which cover the entire campus. Students can use the campus Wi-fi system to connect to their student district computer account, and access school computer resources, to work on school assignments without the need to check into a school computer lab.

== Performing Arts ==
Since its first year with 120 students, the band program has grown to serve over 200 students and offers a wide variety of musical opportunities. Student-run ensembles and solos compete at state championships at Central Washington University every year, often winning 1st, 2nd, or 3rd place in the state. Union Band has won awards for being among the highest average GPA band programs in the state.

The Union High School Choir program won its first WIAA Sanctioned State Championship with the Union High School Select Men's Ensemble in the spring of 2008. In 2009 the Men's Ensemble won the State Solo and Ensemble Contest again, making them the first high school in the state of Washington to win two championships consecutively in their first two years of existence. Their picture was featured on the front cover of the State Solo & Ensemble Booklet.

The Chamber Choir, the only mixed choir at Union High School, was invited to perform at the 2013 national American Choral Director's Association conference in Dallas, Texas. They were one of 30 choirs selected to perform and the only high school choir out of four total to be invited to perform in evening concerts at the Meyerson Symphony Center and Winspear Opera House.

== Notable alumni ==
- Clint Coulter — outfielder for the Milwaukee Brewers organization
- Daniel Seavey — member of Why Don't We
- Jordan Chatman — basketball player
- Ricky Simón — professional mixed martial arts fighter, former LFA Bantamweight Champion, currently in the UFC
- Lincoln Victor – professional American football player
