= Clint Coulter =

American baseball player (born 1993)

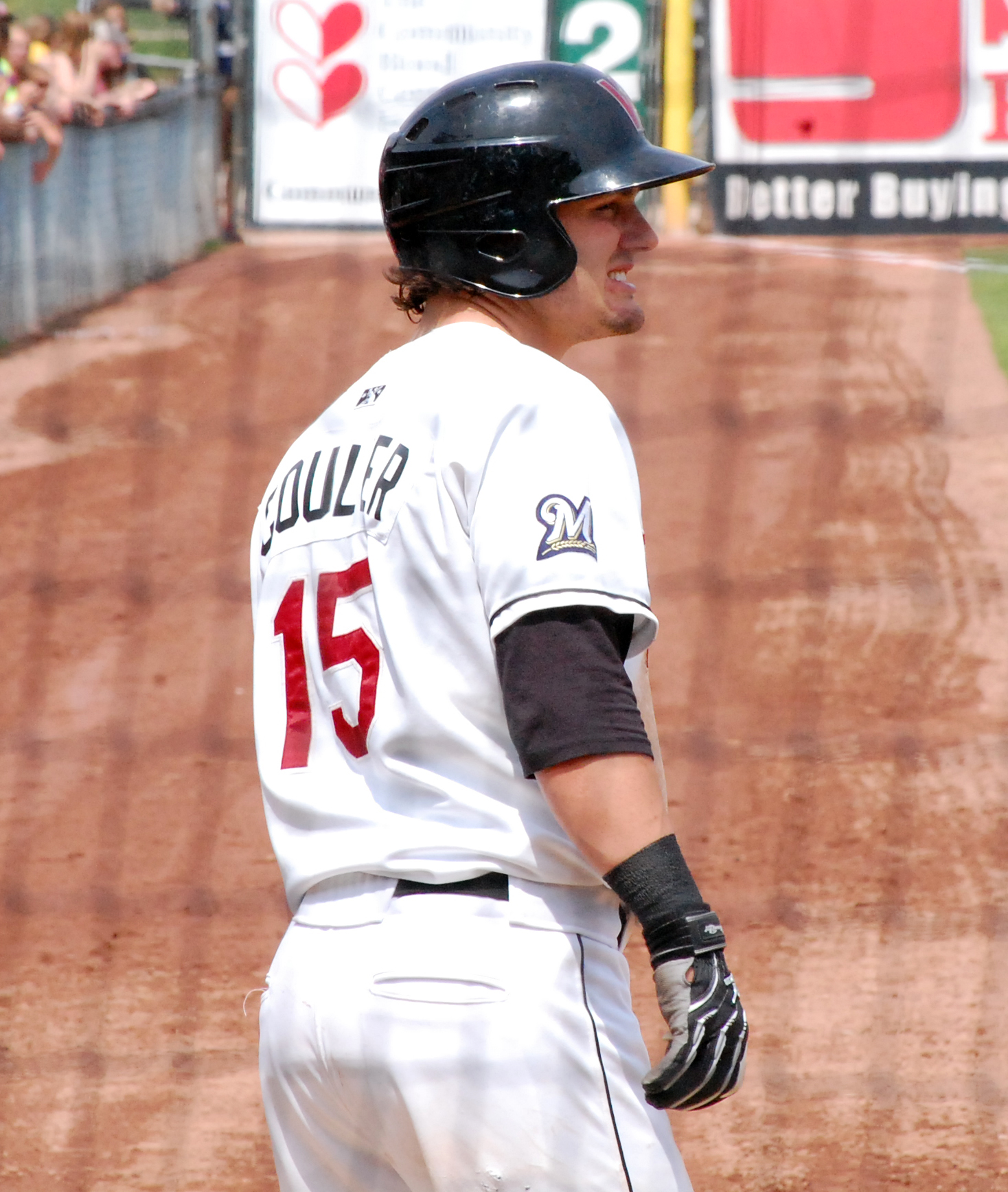
- Coulter with the Wisconsin Timber Rattlers

Free agent
- Outfielder
- Born: July 20, 1993 (age 33); Vancouver, Washington, U.S.
- Bats: Right Throws: Right
- Stats at Baseball Reference

Clinton T. Coulter (born July 30, 1993) is an American professional baseball outfielder who is a free agent. He was drafted 27th overall by the Milwaukee Brewers in the 2012 Major League Baseball draft.

== Career ==
=== Milwaukee Brewers ===
Coulter was drafted by the Milwaukee Brewers in the first round, with the 27th overall selection, of the 2012 Major League Baseball draft out of Union High School in Camas, Washington. He had committed to Arizona State University, but signed with the Brewers. He made his professional debut for the rookie–level Arizona League Brewers, hitting .302/.439/.444 with five home runs in 169 at-bats over 49 games. He spent 2013 with three different teams; the rookie–level Helena Brewers, AZL Brewers and Single–A Wisconsin Timber Rattlers. Overall, he hit .244/.314/.400 with seven home runs over 250 at-bats in 70 games. He returned to the Rattlers to start the 2014 season. He had a bounceback successful season hitting .287 with a .410 on-base percentage, 22 home runs, and 89 runs batted in.

After spending his first three minor league seasons as a catcher, Coulter was moved to the outfield during the Arizona Fall League in 2014. He spent 2015 with the High–A Brevard County Manatees where he batted .246 with 13 home runs and 59 RBIs in a career high 137 games. In 2016, he played for both Brevard County and the Double–A Biloxi Shuckers, posting a combined .246 average with eight home runs and 44 RBIs in 115 games between both teams. He spent 2017 with Biloxi where he batted .234 with 14 home runs and 49 RBIs. In 2018, he hit .255 with 13 home runs and 39 RBI in 106 games split between the High–A Carolina Mudcats, Biloxi, and the Triple–A Colorado Springs Sky Sox. His contract was not renewed by the Brewers organization, and he became a free agent on November 2, 2018.

=== Sioux Falls Canaries ===
On March 29, 2019, Coulter signed with the Sioux Falls Canaries of the American Association of Professional Baseball. Coulter played in 98 games in his first season for Sioux Falls, batting .294/.359/.516 with 18 home runs and 72 RBI.

He played in 55 games for the Canaries in 2020, hitting .264/.314/.496 with 11 home runs and 41 RBI. On April 5, 2021, Coulter re–signed with the Canaries.

=== St. Louis Cardinals ===
On May 12, 2021, Coulter's contract was purchased by the St. Louis Cardinals organization. He spent the remainder of the season with the Triple–A Memphis Redbirds, appearing in 57 games and hitting .234/.303/.461 with 8 home runs and 20 RBI.

Coulter returned to Triple–A Memphis in 2022, playing in 54 contests and slashing .297/.377/.533 with 9 home runs and 33 RBI. He elected free agency following the season on November 10, 2022.

=== San Francisco Giants ===
On December 22, 2022, Coulter signed a minor league contract with the San Francisco Giants organization. Coulter began the 2023 season with the Triple–A Sacramento River Cats, playing in 58 games and hitting .243/.332/.403 with 6 home runs, 39 RBI, and 4 stolen bases. Coulter was released by the Giants on June 28, 2023.

=== Acereros de Monclova ===
On July 11, 2023, Coulter signed with the Acereros de Monclova of the Mexican League. In 24 games for Monclova, Coulter batted .370/.413/.490 with one home run, 13 RBI, and two stolen bases.

=== Gastonia Ghost Peppers ===
On July 2, 2024, Coulter signed with the Gastonia Ghost Peppers of the Atlantic League of Professional Baseball. In 51 games for Gastonia, Coulter slashed .313/.362/.485 with eight home runs, 36 RBI, and seven stolen bases.

=== Chicago Dogs ===
On February 25, 2025, Coulter signed with the Algodoneros de Unión Laguna of the Mexican League. He was released by the Algodoneros prior to the start of the season on April 13. On April 28, Coulter signed with the Chicago Dogs of the American Association of Professional Baseball. In 13 appearances for the Dogs, he batted .261/.393/.348 with one home run and six RBI.

=== Lincoln Saltdogs ===
On June 3, 2025, Coulter was traded to the Lincoln Saltdogs to complete a previous transaction. He made 34 appearances for the Saltdogs, he slashed .238/.312/.361 with three home runs, 15 RBI, and one stolen base. Coulter was released by Lincoln on July 14.
