= Stryker Trahan =

American baseball player (born 1994)

- Outfielder
- Born: April 25, 1994 (age 32); Scott, Louisiana, U.S.
- Bats: Left Throws: Right
- Stats at Baseball Reference

Stryker Louis Trahan (pronounced /ˈtrɒhɒ̃/; born April 25, 1994) is an American former professional baseball outfielder. The Arizona Diamondbacks selected Trahan in the first round of the 2012 Major League Baseball draft out of Acadiana High School in Scott, Louisiana, as a catcher, and shifted him to the outfield in 2014.

== Career ==
Trahan played baseball on travel teams in Louisiana as a catcher. He attended Acadiana High School in Scott, Louisiana, where he played for his school's baseball team. He had a .460 batting average as a junior, and batted .384 as a senior, being named to the Class 5A All-State first team in both his junior and senior years. He participated in baseball showcases for high school players. He also played quarterback and tight end for the school's American football team, which won the state championship. He was honored as All-District as a quarterback in his senior year. He committed to attend the University of Mississippi (Ole Miss) to play college baseball for the Ole Miss Rebels baseball team.

The Arizona Diamondbacks selected Trahan in the first round, with the 26th overall selection, of the 2012 Major League Baseball draft. Rather than enroll at Ole Miss, Trahan signed with the Diamondbacks, receiving a $1.7 million signing bonus. Though the Diamondbacks kept him at catcher, they foresaw the potential need to take him off of the position and play him in the outfield. He made his professional debut that year in the Rookie-level Arizona League, where he batted .281 with a .422 on-base percentage and a .473 slugging percentage. He began 2013 in extended spring training, before he was assigned to the Missoula Osprey of the Rookie-level Pioneer League. He batted .254 with ten home runs and a .462 slugging percentage with Missoula.

Before the 2014 season, the Diamondbacks shifted Trahan to play as a left fielder. He opened the season with the South Bend Silver Hawks of the Class A Midwest League. After batting .198 and striking out in 36% of his plate appearances, the Diamondbacks demoted Trahan to the Hillsboro Hops of the Class A-Short Season Northwest League in July. Trahan homered for Hillsboro in the opening game of the 2014 Northwest League championship series, won by the Hops. In 2015, playing catcher for most of the season, he played for Hillsboro Hops, moved up to Kane County Cougars, and ended the season with Visalia Rawhide. He started the 2016 season back with Visalia Rawhide moving to RF Position.

The Diamondbacks released Trahan in March 2017.

== Personal ==
Trahan was named for the title character in B.L. Stryker. His parents, Donna and Chad, were both catchers for the Acadiana softball and baseball teams, respectively. Donna was also named to the all-state team. Donna died of liver cancer in April 2013. Trahan is married as of November 2015.
