= Acadiana High School =

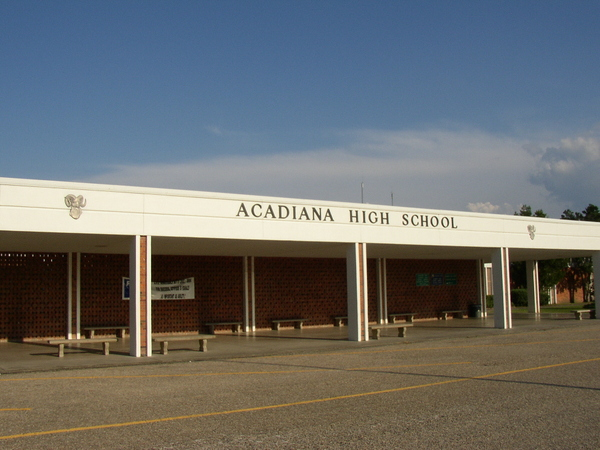

Location
- 315 Rue du Belier; Lafayette, Louisiana; United States; 30°12′24.77″N 92°5′31.64″W

Information
- Established: 1969
- School district: Lafayette Parish School System
- Principal: Amanda Himel
- Teaching staff: 75.57 (2024-2025) (FTE)
- Enrollment: 1,652 (2024–2025)
- Student to teacher ratio: 21.86
- Colors: Green and gold
- Mascot: Rams
- Nickname: Wreckin' Rams
- Newspaper: The Rampage
- Yearbook: Les Memoires

Acadiana High School is located in Scott, Louisiana, United States. Acadiana High School opened in 1969 following the consolidation of Judice High School, located in Judice Community, and Scott High School, located in Scott.

== Athletics ==
Acadiana High athletics competes in the LHSAA and its nickname is "Rams".

Sports include cross country, baseball, basketball, football, golf, soccer, softball, swimming, tennis, track, volleyball and wrestling.

=== Championships ===
Football championships

- (6) State Championships: 2006, 2010, 2013, 2014, 2019, 2020
- Vollyeball Championships 1976

== Notable alumni ==
- Felecia Angelle, voice actress affiliated with Funimation
- Alley Broussard (Class of 2003) – Running Back, LSU Tigers (2003–2006)
- Jacob Cutrera (Class of 2006) – NFL linebacker, Jacksonville Jaguars (2010–2011) and Tampa Bay Buccaneers (2011–2013)
- Joe Fontenot, Former MLB player (Florida Marlins)
- Kenneth George Jr. (class of 2016) – CFL defensive back, Hamilton Tiger-Cats (2023–present)
- Cody Mandell (class of 2012) – NFL cowboys punter, (2014–present)
- Gil Meche (Class of 1996) – MLB pitcher, Seattle Mariners (1999–2000, 2003–2006) and Kansas City Royals (2007–2010)
- Luke Montz, Former MLB player (Washington Nationals)
- Kevin Morgan, Former MLB player (New York Mets)
- Kim Perrot (Class of 1986) – WNBA Houston Comets guard, 1997–1998
- Stryker Trahan (Class of 2012) – baseball player Arizona Diamondbacks
- Sheri Sam (Class of 1992) – WNBA (1999–2009) 2 Time WNBA Champion (Seattle Storm 2004; Detroit Shock 2008)
