= Cape Cod Baseball League =

American collegiate summer baseball league

- Classification: Collegiate Summer Baseball
- Sport: Baseball
- Founded: 1885
- President: Andrew Lang
- Commissioner: John Castleberry
- Motto: Where the Stars of Tomorrow Shine Tonight
- No. of teams: 10
- Country: United States
- Most recent champion: Harwich Mariners
- Most titles: Cotuit Kettleers (17)
- Website: capecodleague.com

The Cape Cod Baseball League (CCBL or Cape League) is a collegiate summer baseball wooden bat league located on Cape Cod in the U.S. state of Massachusetts. One of the nation's premier collegiate summer leagues, the league boasts over 1,000 former players who have gone on to play in the major leagues.

== History ==
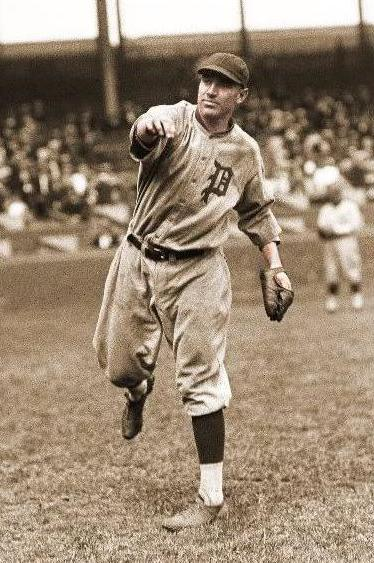
Hall of Famer Pie Traynor played for Falmouth in 1919

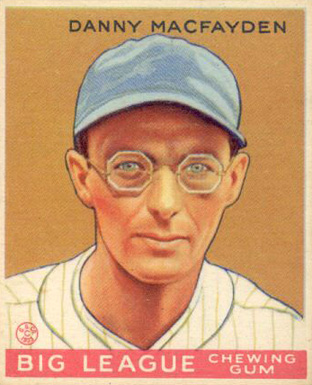
Danny MacFayden (Osterville 1924, Falmouth 1925) played for the Boston Red Sox from 1926 to 1932

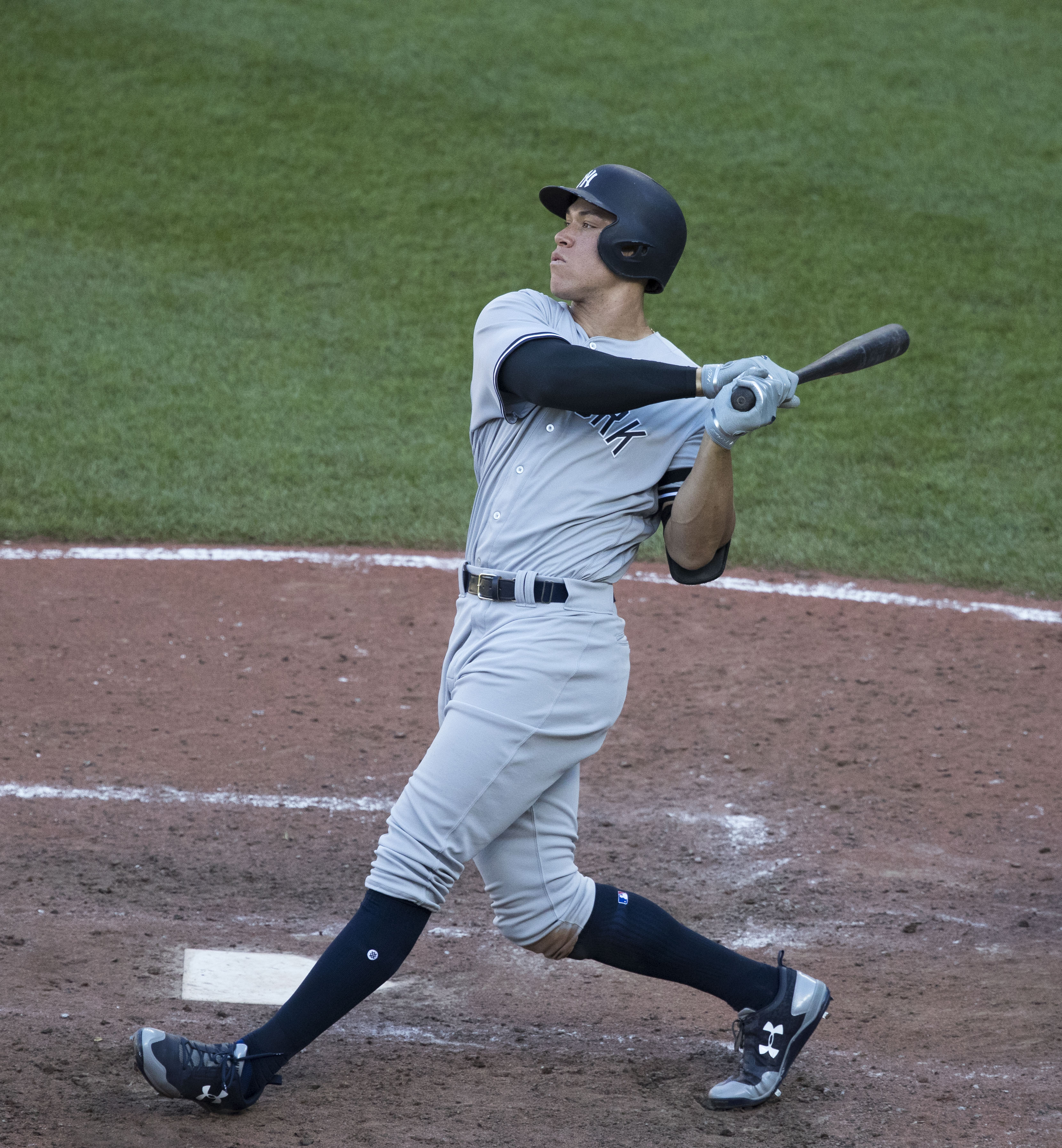
New York Yankees captain Aaron Judge played for Brewster in 2012

=== Pre-modern era ===
==== Origins ====
As early as the 1860s, baseball teams representing various Cape Cod towns and villages were competing against one another. The earliest newspaper account is of an 1867 game in Sandwich between the hometown "Nichols Club" and the visiting Cummaquid team. Though not formalized as a league, the games provided entertainment for residents and summer visitors.

In 1885, a Fourth of July baseball game was held matching teams from Barnstable and Sandwich. According to contemporary accounts, the 1885 contest may have been at least the twelfth such annual game. By the late 19th century, an annual championship baseball tournament was being held each fall at the Barnstable County Fair, an event that continued well into the 20th century, with teams representing towns from Cape Cod and the larger region.

In 1921, the Barnstable County Agricultural Society determined to limit the fair's annual baseball championship to teams from Cape Cod. Falmouth won the championship in 1921, and Osterville in 1922. Interest in baseball was growing, as was a movement to create a formal league of Cape Cod teams.

==== The early Cape League era (1923–1939) ====
The "Cape Cod Baseball League" was formed in 1923, consisting of four teams: Falmouth, Osterville, Hyannis, and Chatham. Teams were made up of players from local colleges and prep schools, along with some semi-pro players and other locals. One notable player during this period was North Truro native Danny "Deacon" MacFayden, who went on to play for seventeen years in the major leagues.

Throughout the 1920s and 1930s, the composition of the league varied from season to season. Towns did not opt to field teams in every season, and teams from other towns such as Bourne, Harwich, Orleans, Provincetown, and Wareham joined the league. Teams were not limited to league play, and often played teams from towns and cities in the larger region, as in 1929 when Falmouth played an exhibition game against the major league Boston Braves.

The league enjoyed widespread popularity throughout the 1930s, and even engendered competition in the form of the Barnstable County Twilight League and the Lower Cape Twilight League. However, as the cumulative effects of the Great Depression made it increasingly more difficult to secure funding for teams, the Cape League disbanded in 1940.

==== The Upper and Lower Cape League era (1946–1962) ====
With young men returning home after World War II, the Cape League was revived in 1946. The league now excluded paid professional or semi-pro players, and for a while attempted to limit players to those who were Cape Cod residents. The league was split into Upper Cape and Lower Cape divisions, and in addition to many of the town teams from the "old" Cape League, new teams now joined such as those representing the Massachusetts Maritime Academy, Otis Air Force Base, and the Cape Verdean Club of Harwich among others.

=== Modern era (1963–present) ===
In 1963, the Cape Cod Baseball League was reorganized and became officially sanctioned by the NCAA. The league would no longer be limited to Cape Cod residents, but would recruit college players and coaches from an increasingly wide radius.

In 1985, the league moved away from the use of aluminum bats, and became the only collegiate summer league in the nation at that time to use wooden bats. This transition began a period of significant growth in the league's popularity and prestige among MLB scouts, as well as among college players and coaches. This popularity has translated into over one thousand former players who have gone on to major league playing careers, including multiple members of the National Baseball Hall of Fame.

== Structure and season ==
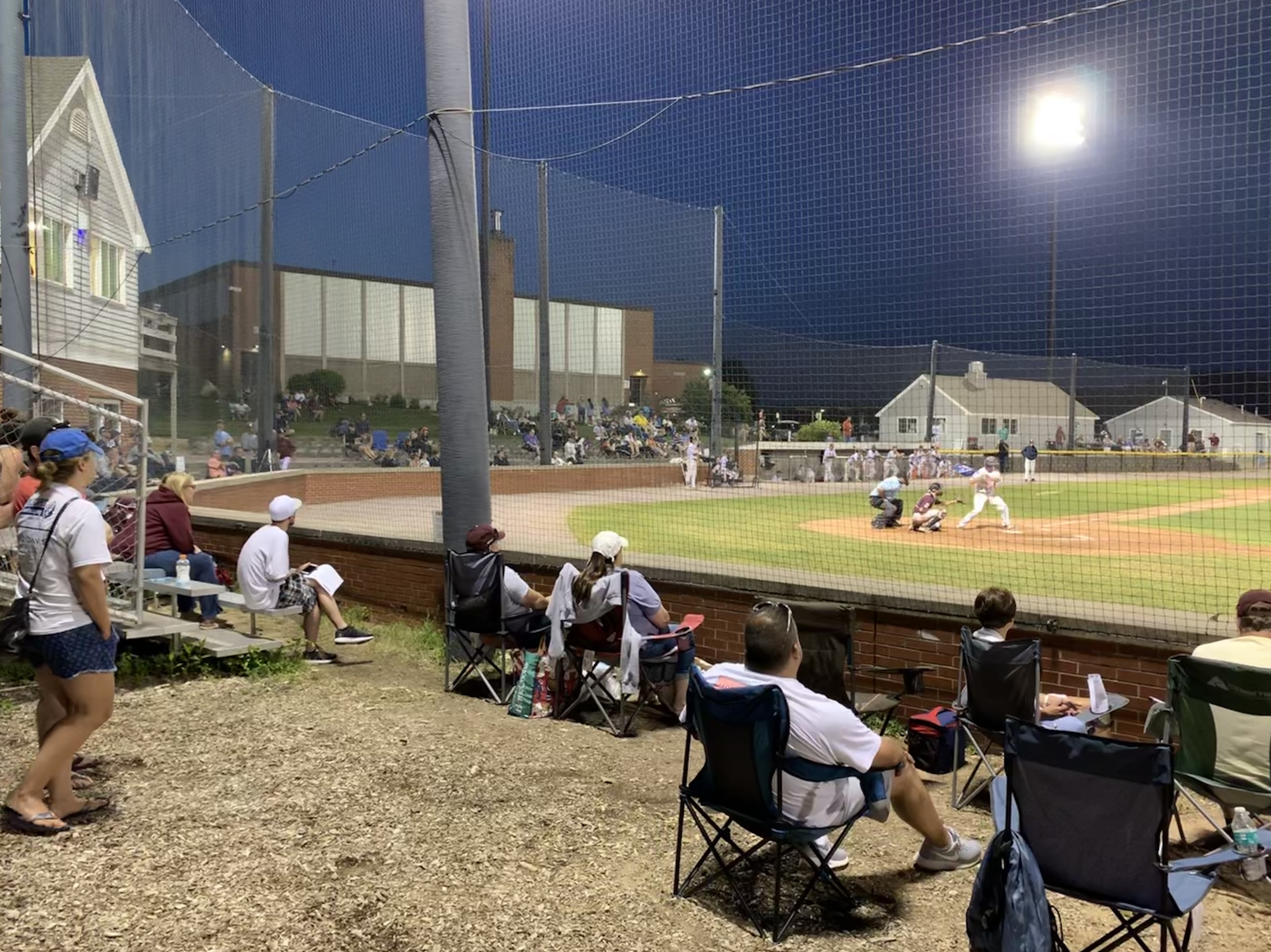
A night game at Doran Park, home of the Bourne Braves

The CCBL regular season runs from mid-June through mid-August. Teams are geographically divided into the East Division and West Division. Each division consists of five teams which each play 40 regular season games, 5 games against each team from within their division, and 4 games against each team from the other division.

During the latter half of the regular season, an all-star game is contested between the all stars from the East and West divisions, and features a pre-game home run hitting contest. The CCBL All-Star Game was played at Fenway Park from 2009 to 2011, but is normally played at one of the CCBL home fields.

Following the regular season, the top four teams in each division qualify for the playoffs, which is an elimination tournament consisting of three rounds of best of three series to determine the league champion and winner of the Arnold Mycock trophy.

== Teams ==
=== Current teams ===
Cape Cod Baseball League teams (West Division teams in red, East Division teams in blue)

Division	Team	Town/Village	First year	Home Field	Capacity
West	Bourne Braves	Bourne	1988	Doran Park (Upper Cape Cod Regional Technical High School)	3,000
West	Cotuit Kettleers	Cotuit	1947	Lowell Park	2,500
West	Falmouth Commodores	Falmouth	1923; 1946	Arnie Allen Diamond at Guv Fuller Field	8,000
West	Hyannis Harbor Hawks	Hyannis	1976	Judy Walden Scarafile Field at McKeon Park (Pope John Paul II High School)	3,000
West	Wareham Gatemen	Wareham	1952	Clem Spillane Field (Wareham High School)	3,000
East	Brewster Whitecaps	Brewster	1988	Stony Brook Field (Stony Brook Elementary School)	4,000
East	Chatham Anglers	Chatham	1946	Veterans Field	8,000
East	Harwich Mariners	Harwich	1946	Whitehouse Field (Monomoy Regional High School)	4,000
East	Orleans Firebirds	Orleans	1947	Eldredge Park (Nauset Regional Middle School)	6,000
East	Yarmouth-Dennis Red Sox	South Yarmouth	1946	Red Wilson Field (Dennis-Yarmouth Regional High School)	5,500

=== Origin of team nicknames ===
Prior to 2009, six of the ten teams in the CCBL shared their team nickname with a team in Major League Baseball (MLB). However, in late 2008 MLB announced that it would enforce its trademarks, and required those CCBL teams to either change their nicknames or buy their uniforms and merchandise only through MLB-licensed vendors.

Three of the teams eventually changed their nicknames. In 2009, the Chatham Athletics became the Anglers, and the Orleans Cardinals became the Firebirds. The following season, the Hyannis Mets became the Harbor Hawks.

The Bourne Braves and Yarmouth–Dennis Red Sox, teams who share nicknames with Boston's two historic professional baseball franchises, chose to keep their nicknames and use MLB licensees for their merchandise.

MLB could not enforce the "Mariners" trademark against the Harwich Mariners because the use of the nickname by Harwich predated the entry of the Seattle Mariners into MLB as an expansion team in 1977.

The four teams whose nicknames were not in conflict with MLB have locally themed names such as the nautical monikers of the Falmouth Commodores and Brewster Whitecaps. The Cotuit Kettleers nickname recalls a legendary local Native American land transaction whose terms of sale involved the exchange of a brass kettle. The Wareham Gatemen are the only team that does not play its home games over the bridge, as the town of Wareham sits on the edge of the mainland, at the "gateway" to Cape Cod. Wareham was considered Cape Cod prior to the construction of the Cape Cod Canal.

=== Franchise timelines ===
Origins

Below is a partial list of Cape Cod baseball teams from the 1860s until the formation of the Cape League in 1923.

- Barnstable Cummaquids
- Barnstable Osceolas
- Barnstable Village
- Chatham
- Falmouth Cottage Club
- Harwich
- Hyannis
- Orleans Pants Factory
- Osterville
- Sandwich Athletics
- Sandwich Nichols Club
- West Barnstable Mastetuketts
- West Falmouth
- Yarmouth Mattakeesetts

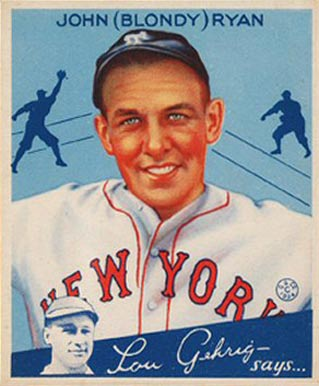
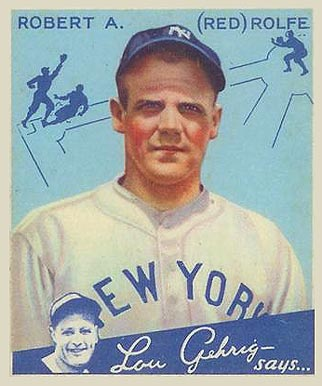
Blondy Ryan and Red Rolfe played for Orleans during the Early Cape League era. Both went on to enjoy long major league careers. Ryan was starting shortstop for the 1933 World Series champion New York Giants, and Rolfe was starting third basemen for five New York Yankees World Series championship teams.

Early Cape League era (1923–1939)

Team	Seasons
Barnstable	1931–1937; 1939
Bourne	1933*–1939
Chatham	1923–1926; 1930–1931
Chatham-Harwich	1927–1929
Falmouth	1923–1939
Harwich	1930–1939
Hyannis	1923–1930
Orleans	1928–1934; 1937–1938
Osterville	1923–1930
Provincetown	1933*
Wareham	1927–1928; 1930–1932
* In 1933, Provincetown withdrew and was replaced by Bourne mid-season.

Upper and Lower Cape League era (1946–1962)

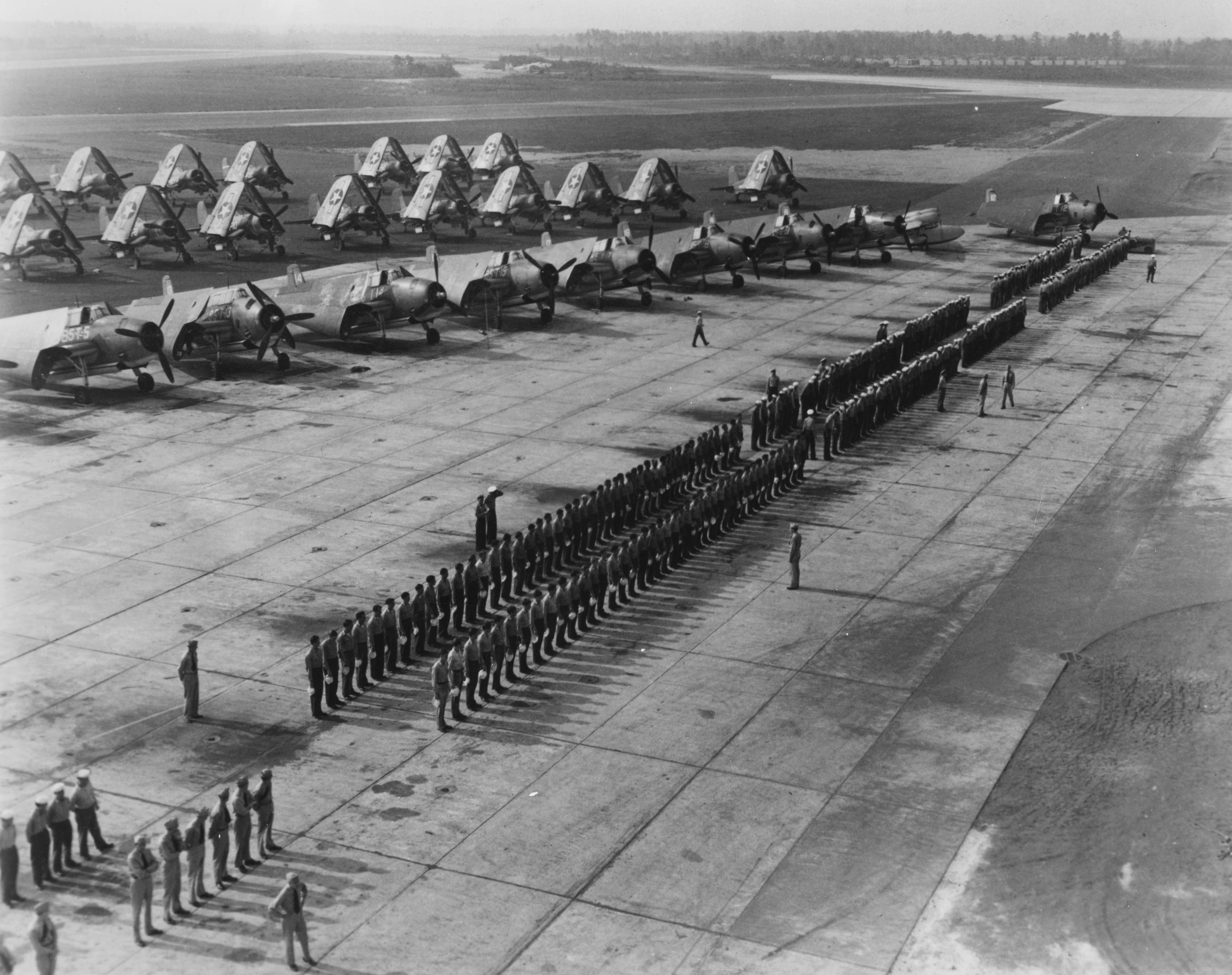
A team from Otis AFB played in the Cape League from the 1940s to the 1960s. View of an inspection at Otis Field in August, 1944.

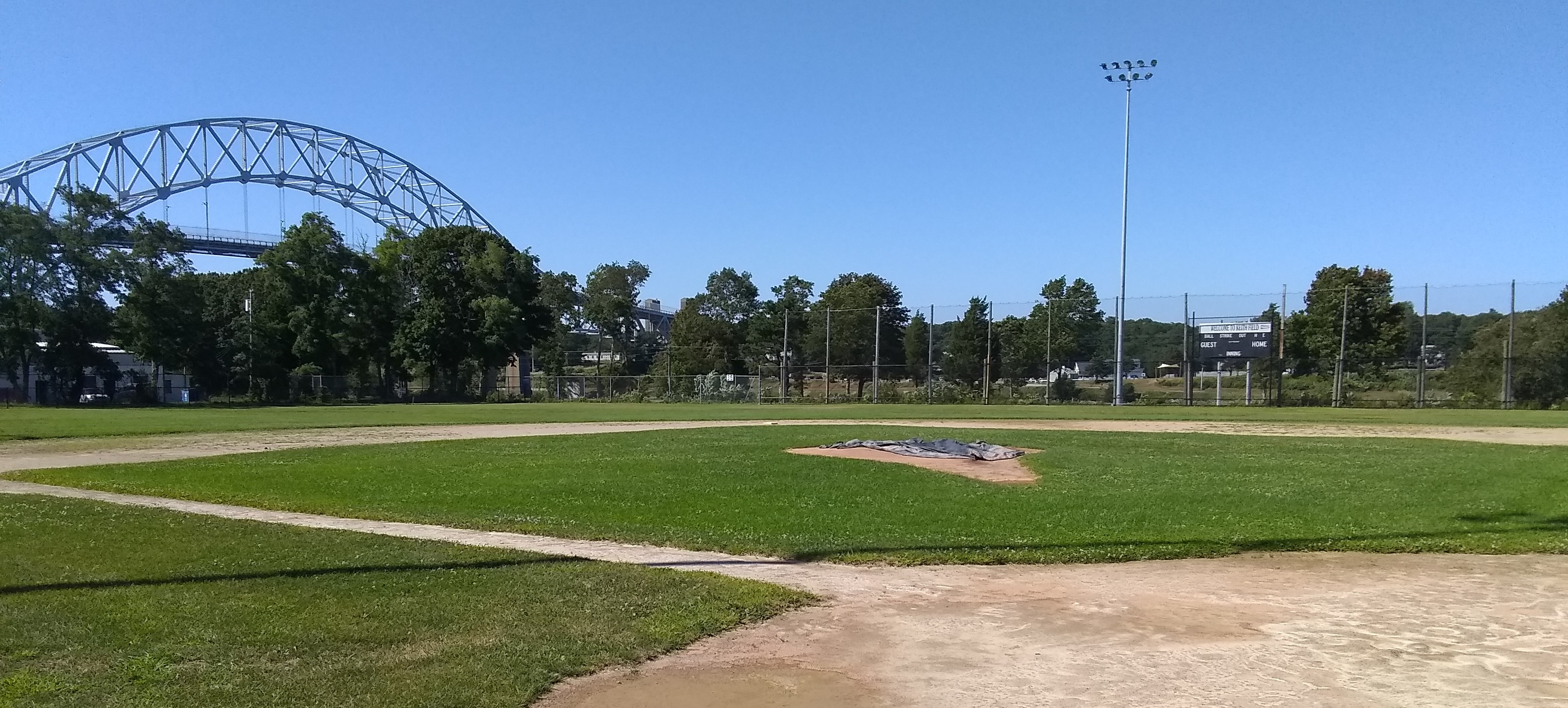
Keith Field, in the shadow of the Sagamore Bridge, was home of the Sagamore Clouters from the 1940s to the 1960s.

Division	Team	Seasons
Upper Cape	Barnstable Townies / Barons / Red Sox	1946*–1952^{†} 1955–1956; 1959–1962
Upper Cape	Bourne Canalmen	1946–1950; 1961–1962
Upper Cape	Cotuit Kettleers	1947–1962
Upper Cape	Falmouth All-Stars	1946–1962
Upper Cape	Falmouth Falcons	1951–1953
Upper Cape	Mashpee Warriors / Indians	1946–1951; 1953–1955
Upper Cape	Massachusetts Maritime Academy	1946–1947^{‡} 1949–1961
Upper Cape	Osterville	1948–1950
Upper Cape	Otis Air Force Base Jets / Minutemen	1949–1950; 1955; 1957–1961
Upper Cape	Sagamore Clouters	1946–1962
Upper Cape	Sandwich	1946–1949
Upper Cape	Wareham Gatemen	1952^{†}–1962

Division	Team	Seasons
Lower Cape	Brewster	1948–1951; 1956–1960
Lower Cape	Chatham	1946–1962
Lower Cape	Dennis Clippers	1946–1961
Lower Cape	Eastham	1949–1955
Lower Cape	Harwich	1946–1962
Lower Cape	Harwich Cape Verdean Club	1949–1950
Lower Cape	North Truro Air Force Station Blue Sox	1952–1957
Lower Cape	Orleans Red Sox	1947–1962
Lower Cape	Wellfleet	1956
Lower Cape	Yarmouth Indians	1946–1962
* Barnstable played in the Lower Cape division in 1946 only.^{†} In 1952, Barnstable withdrew and was replaced by Wareham mid- season.^{‡} Mass. Maritime Academy played in the Lower Cape division in 1946–1947.

Beginnings of the modern era (1963–1987)

From 1963 to 1969, the newly reorganized league maintained the Upper Cape/Lower Cape divisional structure, with the championship series played by the winners of each division. Beginning in 1970, the divisional structure gave way to a single combined league, with the top four teams in the league advancing to the playoffs. This combined league structure continued through 1987.

Team	Seasons
Bourne Canalmen	1963–1964*; 1967–1969; 1971–1972
Cotuit Kettleers	1963–1987
Falmouth All-Stars / Commodores	1963–1987
Hyannis Mets	1976–1987
Sagamore Clouters / Canalmen	1963–1966*
Wareham Gatemen	1963–1987
* In 1965, the Bourne Canalmen and Sagamore Clouters merged. The new team was called the "Sagamore Canalmen" during the 1965 and 1966 seasons, and the "Bourne Canalmen" thereafter.

Team	Seasons
Chatham Red Sox / Athletics	1963–1987
Harwich Mariners	1963–1987
Orleans Cardinals	1963–1987
Otis Air Force Base Minutemen	1963–1964
Yarmouth Indians / Red Sox / Yarmouth-Dennis Red Sox	1963–1987

Present Day

In 1988, the Bourne Braves and the Brewster Whitecaps joined the CCBL as expansion teams and the resulting ten-team league was split into East and West divisions. Since 1988, there have been no changes to the league's franchise composition or divisional alignments.

== League championships ==
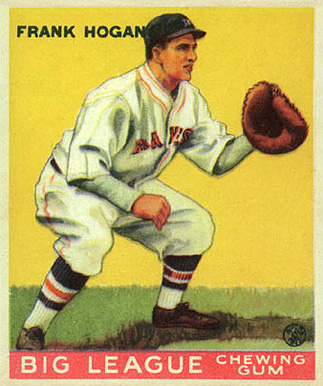
Frank "Shanty" Hogan won a CCBL championship with Osterville in 1924 and went on to a 13-year MLB career with the Boston Braves, New York Giants and Washington Senators.

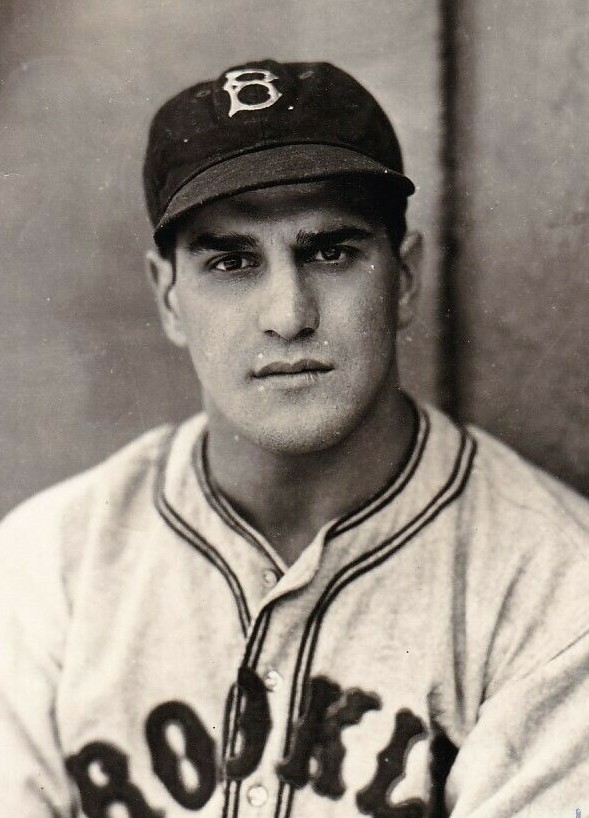
Frank Skaff was an all-league outfielder for Harwich's 1933 title club, and went on to play for the Brooklyn Dodgers

Championships by season, 1923–1939
Year	Winning Team	Manager	Games	Losing Team*	Manager	Ref
1923	Falmouth	Byron H. Parker; Frank Silva				
1924	Osterville	Arthur "Dutch" Ayer				
1925	Osterville	Joe Murphy				
1926	Hyannis / Osterville (co-champs)	Freddie Moncewicz (Hyannis); John "Dot" Whelan (Osterville)				
1927	Hyannis	Freddie Moncewicz				
1928	Osterville	Eddie McGrath				
1929	Falmouth	Lynn Wells				
1930	Wareham	Harry Noznesky				
1931	Falmouth	Jack Walsh				
1932	Falmouth	Jack Walsh				
1933	Harwich	Joe Harraghy	3–0	Falmouth	Jack Walsh	
1934	Barnstable	Pete Herman				
1935	Falmouth	Jack Walsh	3–2	Barnstable	Pete Herman	
1936	Bourne	Larry Donovan				
1937	Barnstable	Pete Herman				
1938	Falmouth	Bill Boehner				
1939	Falmouth	Buzz Harvey				

Championships by Team, 1923–1939
Team	Won	Championship Seasons
Falmouth	7	1923, 1929, 1931, 1932, 1935, 1938, 1939
Osterville	4	1924, 1925, 1926, 1928
Hyannis	2	1926, 1927
Barnstable	2	1934, 1937
Wareham	1	1930
Harwich	1	1933
Bourne	1	1936

* During the 1923–1939 era, postseason playoffs were a rarity. In most years, the regular season pennant winner was simply crowned as the league champion.
However, there were four years in which the league split its regular season and crowned separate champions for the first and second halves. In two of those
seasons (1936 and 1939), a single team won both halves and was declared overall champion. In the other two split seasons (1933 and 1935), a postseason
playoff series was contested between the two half-season champions to determine the overall champion.

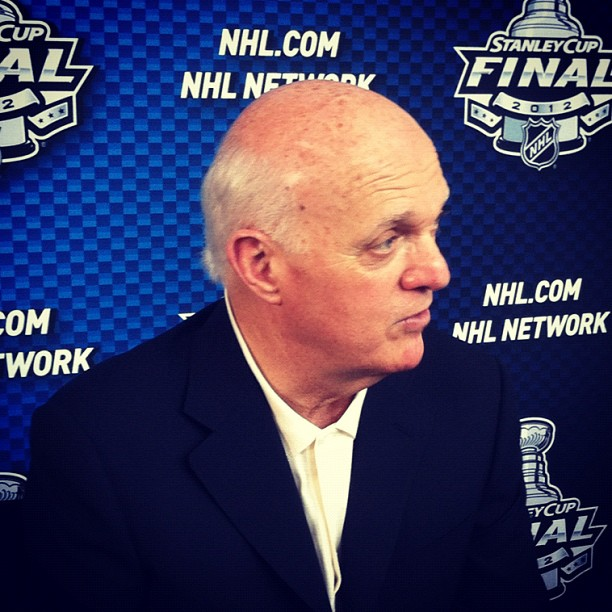
CCBL Hall of Famer Lou Lamoriello came up short in back-to-back CCBL title series as a player with Harwich and Orleans in 1962 and 1963, but won a league title in 1965 as manager of Sagamore.

Championships by season, 1946–1962
Year	Winning Team	Manager	Games	Losing Team	Manager	Ref
1946	Falmouth	John DeMello	2–1	Harwich	Charley Jones	
1947	Orleans	Herb Fuller	2–0	Mashpee	Herb Gardner	
1948	Mashpee	Herb Gardner	3–2	Orleans	Herb Fuller	
1949	Orleans	Laurin Peterson	3–1	Falmouth	Willard E. Boyden	
1950	Orleans	Laurin Peterson	3–2	Sagamore	George Karras	
1951	Sagamore	George Karras	3–2	Orleans	Laurin Peterson	
1952	Orleans	Laurin Peterson	3–0	Sagamore	George Karras	
1953	Orleans	Laurin Peterson	3–0	Sagamore	George Karras	
1954	Sagamore	George Karras	3–2	Orleans	Laurin Peterson	
1955	Orleans	Laurin Peterson	3–0	Cotuit	Cal Burlingame	
1956	Sagamore	Manny Pena	2–0	Dennis	Bren Taylor	
1957	Orleans	Laurin Peterson	2–0	Wareham	Steve Robbins	
1958	Yarmouth	John Halunen	2–0	Sagamore	Manny Pena	
1959	Sagamore	Manny Pena	2–0	Orleans	Laurin Peterson	
1960	Yarmouth	John Halunen	2–1	Sagamore	Manny Pena	
1961	Cotuit	Jim Hubbard	2–1	Yarmouth	John Halunen	
1962	Cotuit	Jim Hubbard	2–0	Harwich	Dave Gavitt	

Championships by Team, 1946–1962
Team	Won	Championship Seasons
Orleans	7	1947, 1949, 1950, 1952, 1953, 1955, 1957
Sagamore	4	1951, 1954, 1956, 1959
Cotuit	2	1961, 1962
Yarmouth	2	1958, 1960
Falmouth	1	1946
Mashpee	1	1948

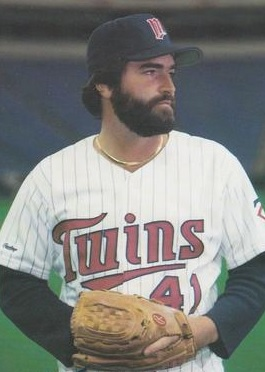
CCBL Hall of Famer Jeff Reardon pitched for the 1974 and 1975 champion Cotuit Kettleers.

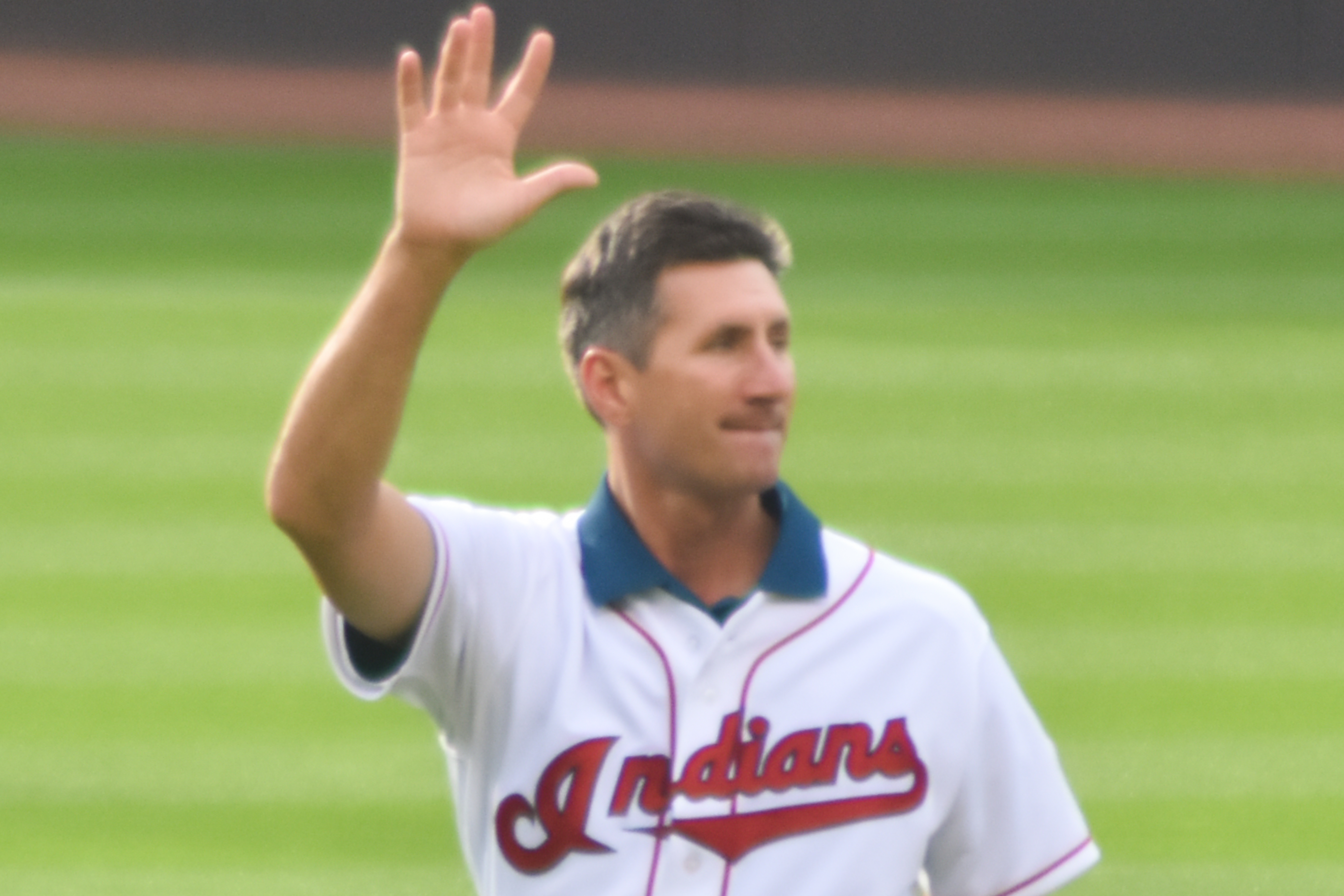
Charles Nagy was playoff MVP of Harwich's 1987 championship season.

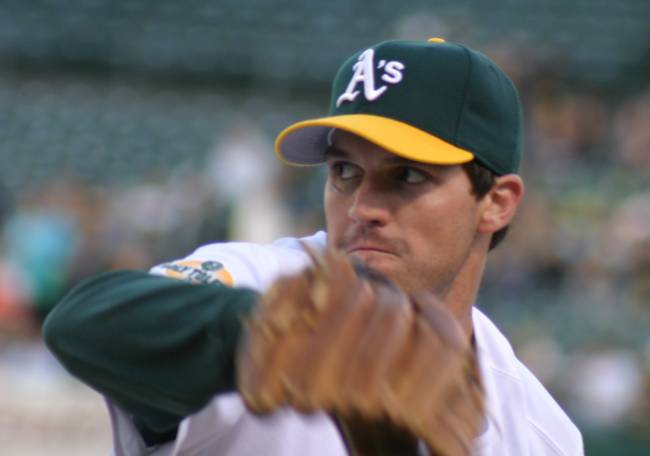
Barry Zito pitched for the 1997 CCBL champion Wareham Gatemen

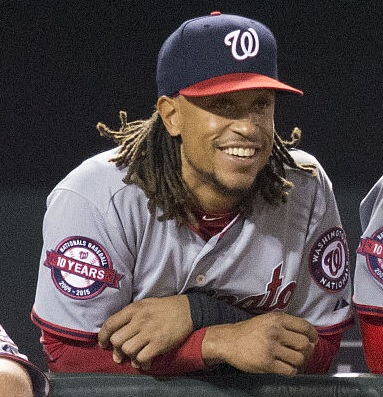
Emmanuel Burriss won playoff co-MVP in Orleans' 2005 championship season

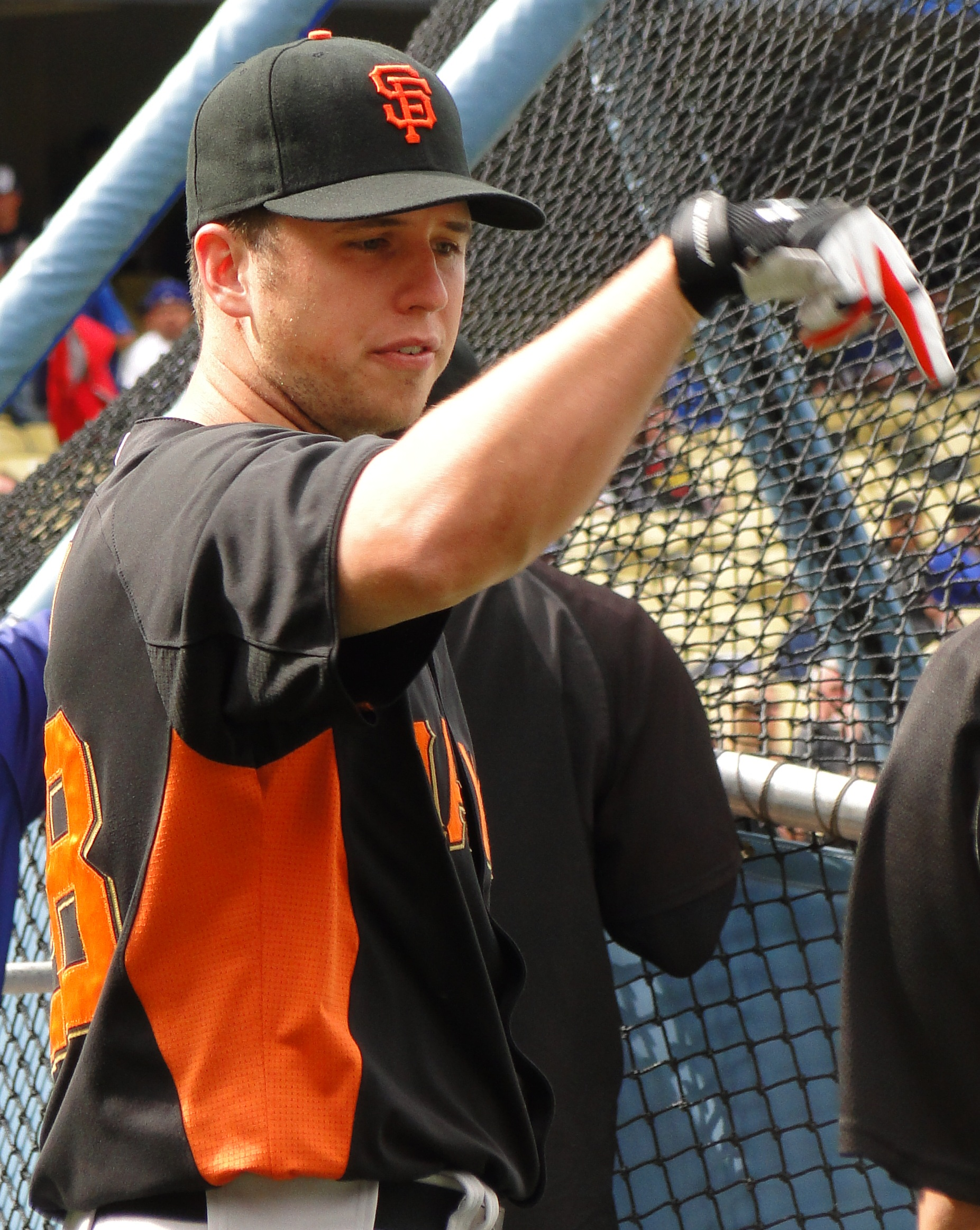
Buster Posey played shortstop and catcher for the 2006 & 2007 back-to-back CCBL champion Y-D Red Sox

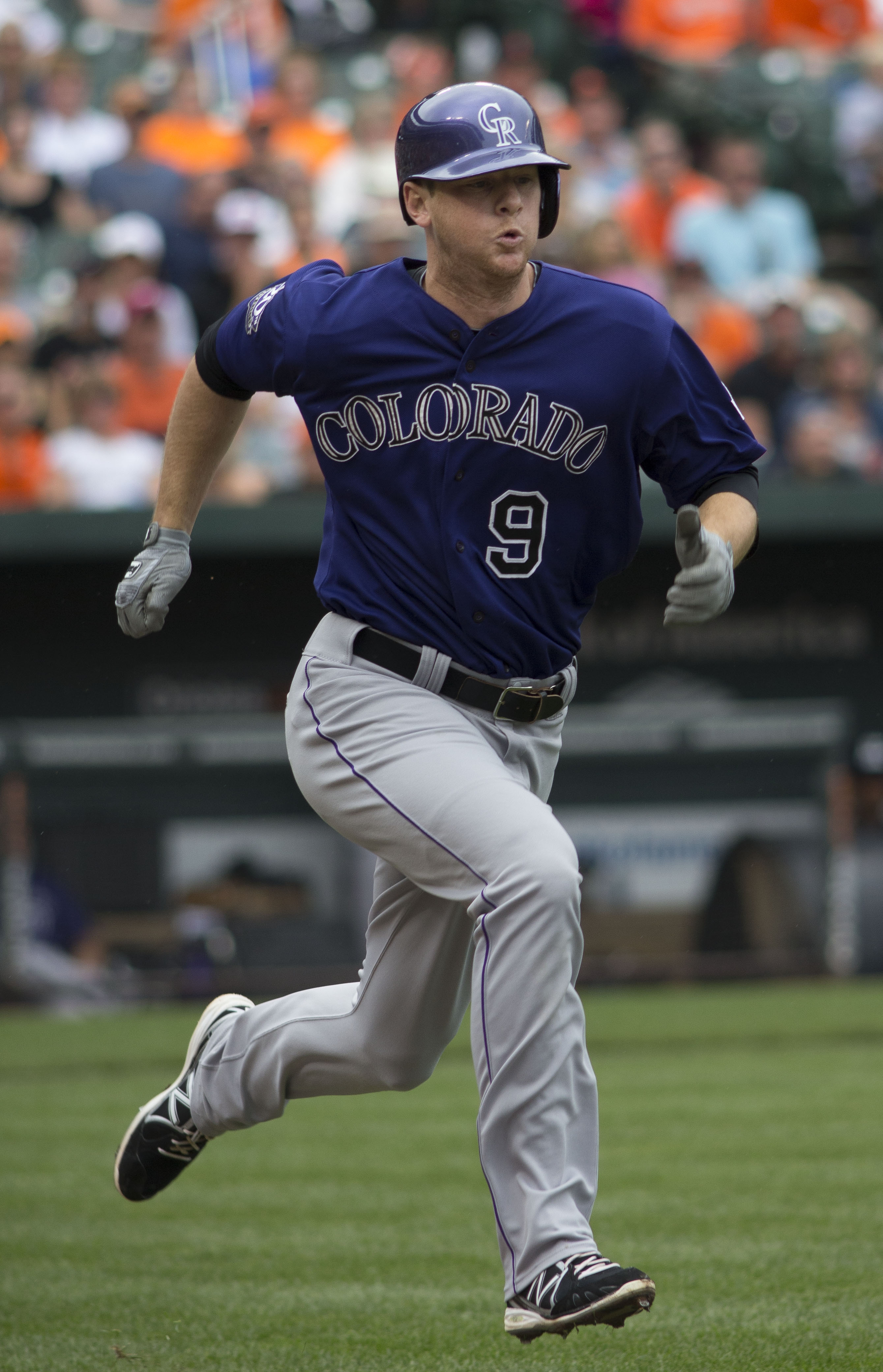
DJ LeMahieu played on Harwich's 2008 CCBL championship team

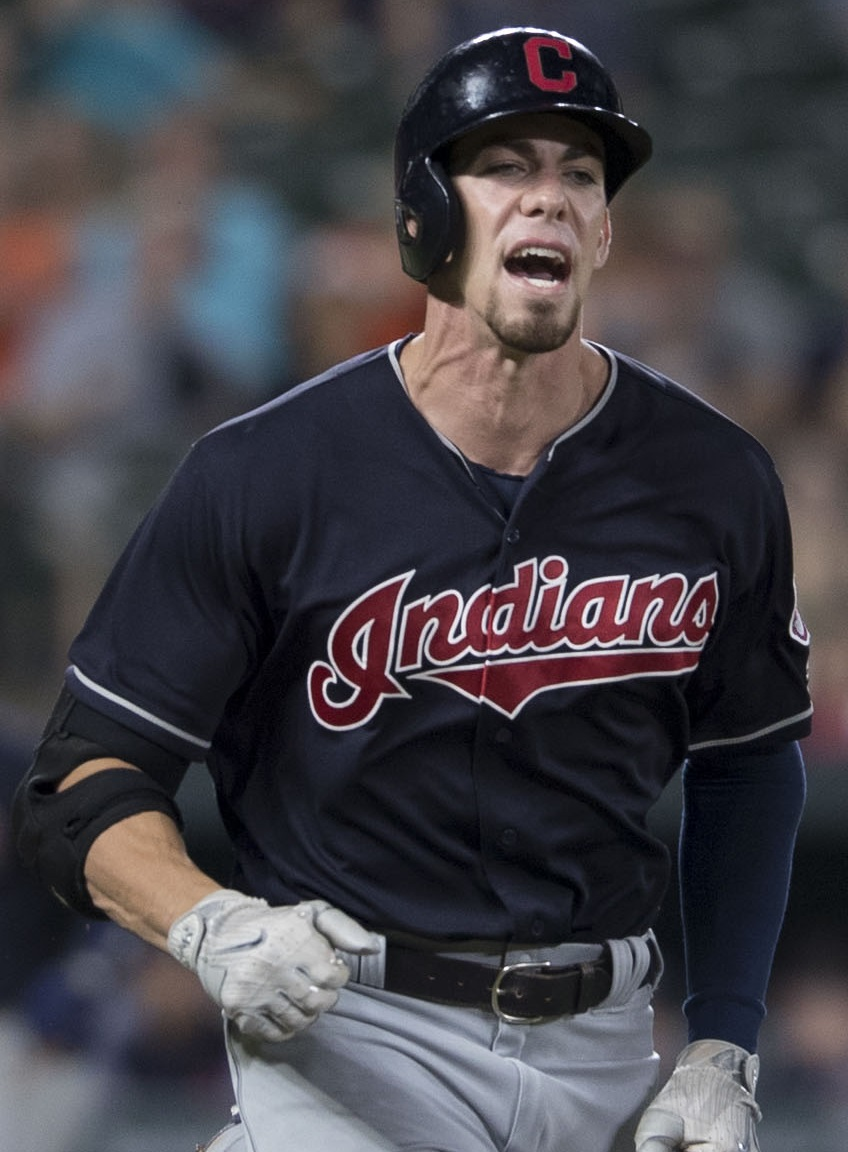
Bradley Zimmer was playoff MVP of Cotuit's 2013 championship season

Championships by season, 1963–present
Year	Winning team	Manager	Games	Losing team	Manager	Playoff MVP	Ref
1963	Cotuit	Jim Hubbard	2–0	Orleans	Dave Gavitt	Not Awarded	
1964	Cotuit	Jim Hubbard	3–1	Chatham	Joe "Skip" Lewis	Not Awarded	
1965	Sagamore	Lou Lamoriello	3–2	Chatham	Joe "Skip" Lewis	Not Awarded	
1966	Falmouth	Bill Livesey	3–1	Chatham	Joe "Skip" Lewis	Not Awarded	
1967	Chatham	Joe "Skip" Lewis	2–0–1	Falmouth	Bill Livesey	Not Awarded	
1968	Falmouth	Bill Livesey	3–1	Harwich	John Carroll	Not Awarded	
1969	Falmouth	Bill Livesey	2–1	Chatham	Joe "Skip" Lewis	Not Awarded	
1970	Falmouth	Bill Livesey	2–0	Orleans	Tony Williams	Not Awarded	
1971	Falmouth	Bill Livesey	3–2	Orleans	Tony Williams	Not Awarded	
1972	Cotuit	Jack McCarthy	3–1	Chatham	Ben Hays	Not Awarded	
1973	Cotuit	Jack McCarthy	3–1	Yarmouth	Merrill "Red" Wilson	Not Awarded	
1974	Cotuit	Jack McCarthy	3–2	Orleans	Tom Yankus	Not Awarded	
1975	Cotuit	Jack McCarthy	3–2	Falmouth	Jack Gillis	Not Awarded	
1976	Wareham	Bill Livesey	3–2	Chatham	Ed Lyons	Not Awarded	
1977	Cotuit	Jack McCarthy	3–2	Y-D	Bob Stead	Not Awarded	
1978	Hyannis	Bob Schaefer	3–1	Harwich	Don Prohovich	Not Awarded	
1979	Hyannis	Bob Schaefer	3–1	Harwich	Don Prohovich	Not Awarded	
1980	Falmouth	Al Worthington	3–2	Chatham	Ed Lyons	Not Awarded	
1981	Cotuit	George Greer	3–1	Orleans	Jack Donahue	Not Awarded	
1982	Chatham	Ed Lyons	3–0	Hyannis	Rich Magner	Not Awarded	
1983	Harwich	Steve Ring	3–2	Cotuit	George Greer	Not Awarded	
1984	Cotuit	George Greer	2–0	Wareham	Mike Roberts	Not Awarded	
1985	Cotuit	George Greer	2–1	Chatham	John Mayotte	Grady Hall, Cotuit	
1986	Orleans	John Castleberry	2–0	Cotuit	George Greer	Gary Alexander, Orleans	
1987	Harwich	Bill Springman	2–1	Y-D	Don Reed	Charles Nagy, Harwich	
1988	Wareham	Stan Meek	2–1	Orleans	John Castleberry	John Thoden, Wareham	
1988	Wareham	Stan Meek	2–1	Orleans	John Castleberry	Mo Vaughn, Wareham	
1989	Y-D	Don Reed	2–0	Hyannis	Ed Lyons	Mark Sweeney, Y-D	
1990	Y-D	Don Reed	2–1	Wareham	Jim Fleming	Kirk Piskor, Y-D	
1991	Hyannis	Brad Kelley	2–0	Chatham	Rich Hill	Chad McConnell, Hyannis	
1992	Chatham	Rich Hill	2–0	Cotuit	Roger Bidwell	Steve Duda, Chatham	
1993	Orleans	Rolando Casanova	2–0	Wareham	Don Reed	Chris Ciaccio, Orleans	
1994	Wareham	Don Reed	2–0	Brewster	Bill Mosiello	Chris Boni, Wareham	
1995	Cotuit	Mike Coutts	2–1	Chatham	John Schiffner	Josh Paul, Cotuit	
1995	Cotuit	Mike Coutts	2–1	Chatham	John Schiffner	Josh Gandy, Cotuit	
1996	Chatham	John Schiffner	2–0	Falmouth	Harvey Shapiro	Jermaine Clark, Chatham	
1996	Chatham	John Schiffner	2–0	Falmouth	Harvey Shapiro	Keith Evans, Chatham	
1997	Wareham	Don Reed	2–0	Harwich	Chad Holbrook	Kevin Hodge, Wareham	
1998	Chatham	John Schiffner	3–2	Wareham	Don Reed	Matt Cepicky, Chatham	
1998	Chatham	John Schiffner	3–2	Wareham	Don Reed	Ryan Earey, Chatham	
1999	Cotuit	Mike Coutts	2–1	Chatham	John Schiffner	Garrett Atkins, Cotuit	
2000	Brewster	Dave Lawn	2–0	Hyannis	Tom O'Connell	Jack Headley, Brewster	
2000	Brewster	Pat Shine	2–0	Hyannis	Tom O'Connell	Jack Headley, Brewster	
2001	Wareham	Cooper Farris	2–1	Chatham	John Schiffner	Aaron Hill, Wareham	
2002	Wareham	Cooper Farris	2–1	Orleans	Carmen Carcone	Matt Kutler, Wareham	
2003	Orleans	Carmen Carcone	2–0	Bourne	Harvey Shapiro	Cesar Nicolas, Orleans	
2004	Y-D	Scott Pickler	2–0	Falmouth	Jeff Trundy	Ryan Rohlinger, Y-D	
2004	Y-D	Scott Pickler	2–0	Falmouth	Jeff Trundy	Joshua Faiola, Y-D	
2005	Orleans	Kelly Nicholson	2–1	Bourne	Harvey Shapiro	Brad Meyers, Orleans	
2005	Orleans	Kelly Nicholson	2–1	Bourne	Harvey Shapiro	Emmanuel Burriss, Orleans	
2006	Y-D	Scott Pickler	2–1	Wareham	Cooper Farris	David Robertson, Y-D	
2007	Y-D	Scott Pickler	2–0	Falmouth	Jeff Trundy	Trevor Holder, Y-D	
2008	Harwich	Steve Englert	2–0	Cotuit	Mike Roberts	Jason Stidham, Harwich	
2008	Harwich	Steve Englert	2–0	Cotuit	Mike Roberts	Marc Fleury, Harwich	
2009	Bourne	Harvey Shapiro	2–0	Cotuit	Mike Roberts	Kyle Roller, Bourne	
2010	Cotuit	Mike Roberts	2–1	Y-D	Scott Pickler	Jordan Leyland, Cotuit	
2011	Harwich	Steve Englert	2–0	Falmouth	Jeff Trundy	Mike Garza, Harwich	
2012	Wareham	Cooper Farris	2–1	Y-D	Scott Pickler	Kyle Schwarber, Wareham	
2013	Cotuit	Mike Roberts	2–0	Orleans	Kelly Nicholson	Bradley Zimmer, Cotuit	
2014	Y-D	Scott Pickler	2–0	Falmouth	Jeff Trundy	Walker Buehler, Y-D	
2014	Y-D	Scott Pickler	2–0	Falmouth	Jeff Trundy	Marcus Mastrobuoni, Y-D	
2015	Y-D	Scott Pickler	2–1	Hyannis	Chad Gassman	Ben Bowden, Y-D	
2015	Y-D	Scott Pickler	2–1	Hyannis	Chad Gassman	Donnie Walton, Y-D	
2016	Y-D	Scott Pickler	2–1	Falmouth	Jeff Trundy	Kevin Smith, Y-D	
2017	Brewster	Jamie Shevchik	2–1	Bourne	Harvey Shapiro	Nick Dunn, Brewster	
2017	Brewster	Jamie Shevchik	2–1	Bourne	Harvey Shapiro	Hunter Bishop, Brewster	
2018	Wareham	Don Sneddon	2–0	Chatham	Tom Holliday	Austin Shenton, Wareham	
2019	Cotuit	Mike Roberts	2–0	Harwich	Steve Englert	Casey Schmitt, Cotuit	
2020	Season cancelled due to coronavirus pandemic						
2021	Brewster	Jamie Shevchik	2–0	Bourne	Harvey Shapiro	Chad Castillo, Brewster	
2022	Bourne	Scott Landers	2–0	Brewster	Jamie Shevchik	Bryce Eblin, Bourne	
2023	Bourne	Scott Landers	2–1	Orleans	Kelly Nicholson	Josh Kuroda-Grauer, Bourne	
2024	Harwich	Steve Englert	2–1	Bourne	Scott Landers	Wilson Weber, Harwich	
2025	Bourne	Scott Landers	2–0	Y-D	Scott Pickler	Jon LeGrande, Bourne	
2026	Harwich	Steve Englert	2–1	Bourne	Scott Landers	JP Peltier, Harwich	

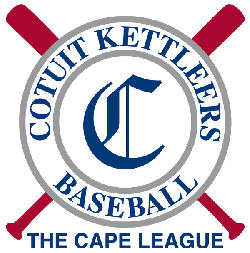
The Cotuit Kettleers' record of 15 titles in the modern era and 17 overall is unmatched among CCBL franchises.

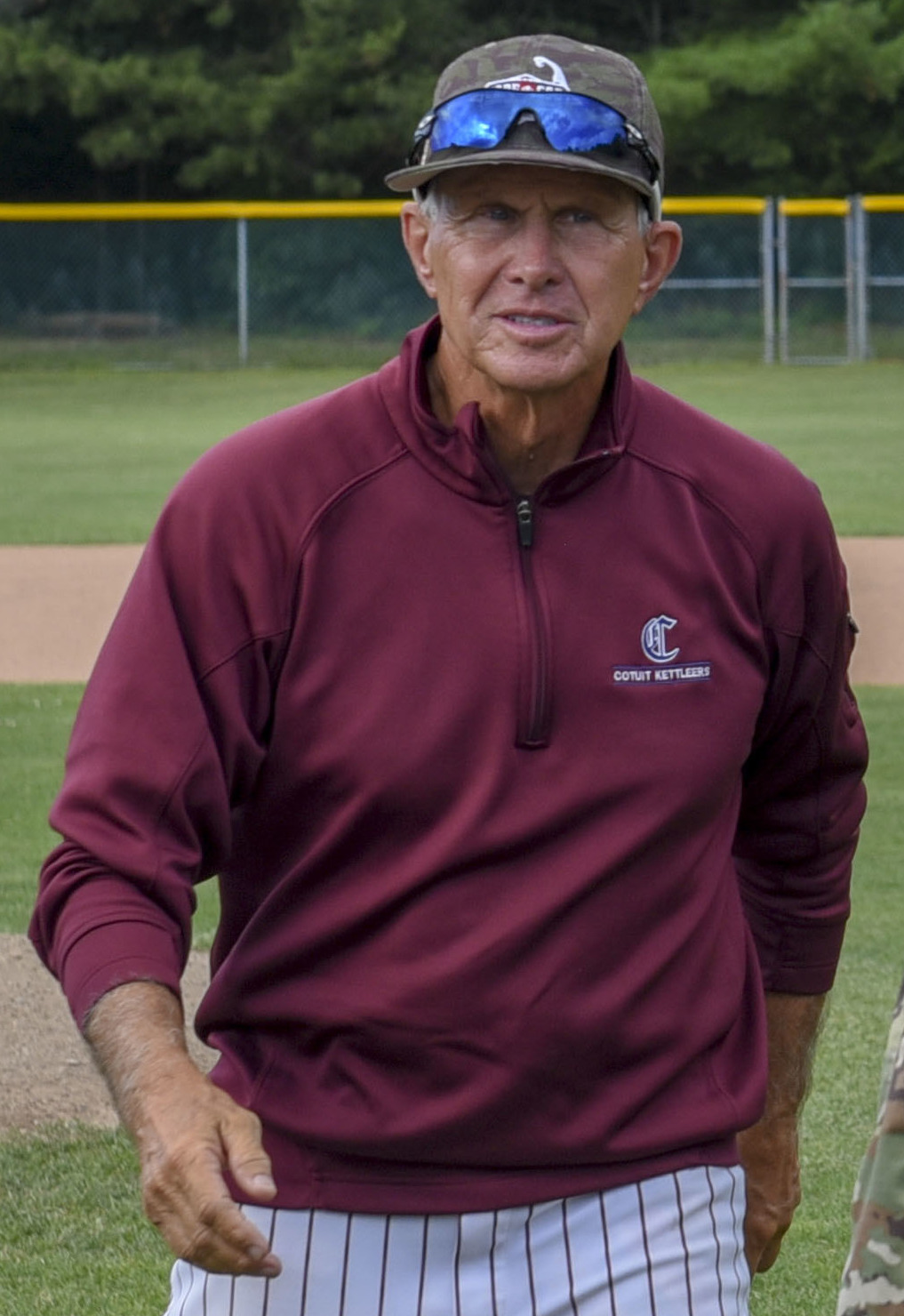
Skipper Mike Roberts led Cotuit to CCBL titles in 2010, 2013 and 2019

Championships by Team, 1963–present
Team	Won	Played	Last Won	Last Played
Cotuit	15	20	2019	2019
Wareham	8	13	2018	2018
Y-D*	8	14	2016	2025
Falmouth	6	14	1980	2016
Harwich	6	11	2026	2026
Chatham	5	18	1998	2018
Harwich	5	10	2024	2024
Orleans	4	13	2005	2023
Bourne	4	9	2025	2026
Hyannis	3	7	1991	2015
Brewster	3	5	2021	2022
Sagamore^{†}	1	1	1965	1965
* Includes records of predecessor Yarmouth Indians.^{†} Defunct.

Championships by Team, 1923–present
Team	Won	Championship Seasons
Cotuit	17	1961, 1962, 1963, 1964, 1972, 1973, 1974, 1975, 1977, 1981, 1984, 1985, 1995, 1999, 2010, 2013, 2019
Falmouth	14	1923, 1929, 1931, 1932, 1935, 1938, 1939, 1946, 1966, 1968, 1969, 1970, 1971, 1980
Orleans	11	1947, 1949, 1950, 1952, 1953, 1955, 1957, 1986, 1993, 2003, 2005
Y-D*	10	1958, 1960, 1989, 1990, 2004, 2006, 2007, 2014, 2015, 2016
Wareham	9	1930, 1976, 1988, 1994, 1997, 2001, 2002, 2012, 2018
Harwich	7	1933, 1983, 1987, 2008, 2011, 2024, 2026
Hyannis	5	1926, 1927, 1978, 1979, 1991
Sagamore^{†}	5	1951, 1954, 1956, 1959, 1965
Chatham	5	1967, 1982, 1992, 1996, 1998
Bourne	5	1936, 2009, 2022, 2023, 2025
Osterville^{†}	4	1924, 1925, 1926, 1928
Brewster	3	2000, 2017, 2021
Barnstable^{†}	2	1934, 1937
Mashpee^{†}	1	1948
* Includes records of predecessor Yarmouth Indians.^{†} Defunct.

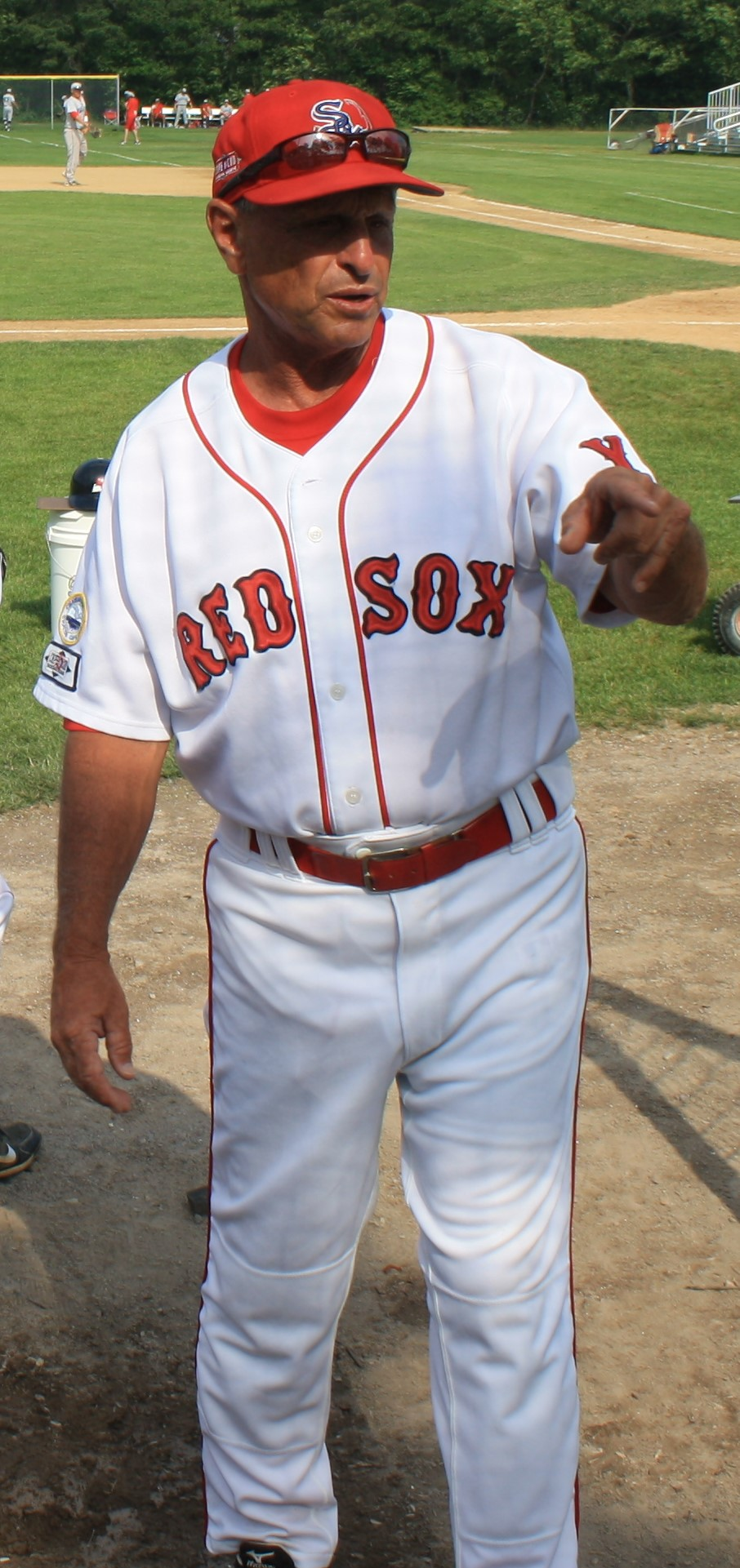
CCBL Hall of Famer Scott Pickler has led Y-D to six league titles

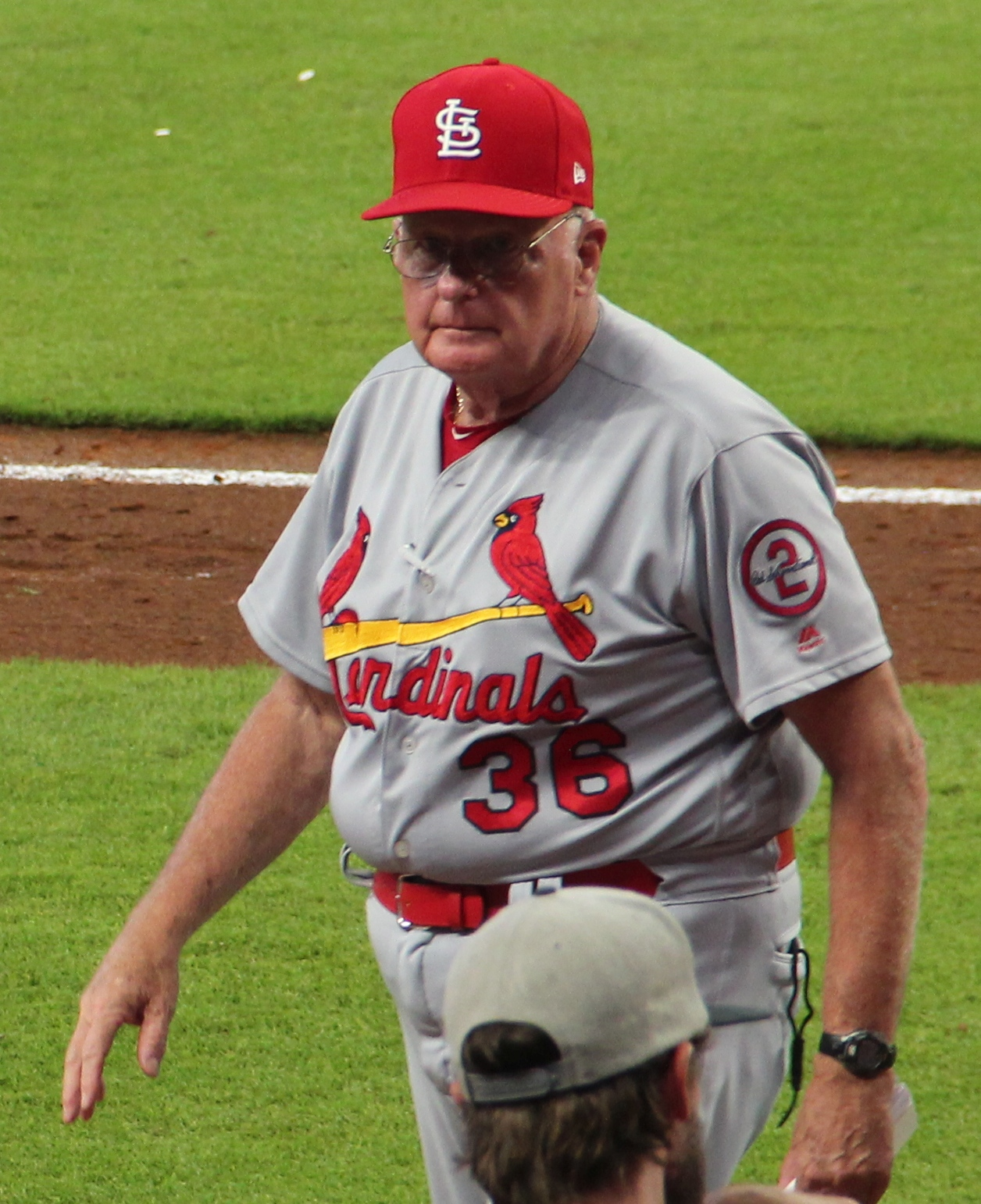
CCBL Hall of Famer George Greer skippered Cotuit to three league titles in the 1980s

Championships by Manager, 1923–present
Manager	Team	Seasons as Manager	Total Seasons	Total Championships	Championship Seasons
Scott Pickler	Y-D	1998–2026	28*	6	2004, 2006, 2007, 2014, 2015, 2016
Bill Livesey	Falmouth; Wareham	1965–1972 (Falmouth); 1976–1977 (Wareham)	10	6	1966, 1968, 1969, 1970, 1971 (Falmouth); 1976 (Wareham)
Laurin Peterson	Orleans	1949–1962	14	6	1949, 1950, 1952, 1953, 1955, 1957
Jack McCarthy	Cotuit	1970–1978	9	5	1972, 1973, 1974, 1975, 1977
Steve Englert	Harwich	2003–2026	23*	4	2008, 2011, 2024, 2026
Don Reed	Y-D; Wareham	1987–1990 (Y-D); 1991–1999 (Wareham)	13	4	1989, 1990 (Y-D); 1994, 1997 (Wareham)
Jim Hubbard	Cotuit	1961–1969	9	4	1961, 1962, 1963, 1964
Scott Landers	Bourne	2022–2026	5	3	2022, 2023, 2025
Mike Roberts	Wareham; Cotuit	1984, 2000 (Wareham); 2004–2024 (Cotuit)	22*	3	2010, 2013, 2019 (Cotuit)
Cooper Farris	Wareham	2001–2004; 2006–2015	14	3	2001, 2002, 2012
George Greer	Cotuit	1979–1987	9	3	1981, 1984, 1985
Jack Walsh	Falmouth	1931–1936	6	3	1931, 1932, 1935
Jamie Shevchik	Brewster	2015–2026	11*	2	2017, 2021
John Schiffner	Chatham	1993–2017	25	2	1996, 1998
Mike Coutts	Cotuit	1995–1996; 1999–2001	5	2	1995, 1999
Bob Schaefer	Bourne; Hyannis	1971–1972 (Bourne); 1978–1979 (Hyannis)	4	2	1978, 1979 (Hyannis)
John Halunen	Yarmouth	1958–1963	6	2	1958, 1960
Manny Pena	Sagamore	1956–1961	6	2	1956, 1959
George Karras	Sagamore	1948–1954	7	2	1951, 1954
Pete Herman	Chatham; Barnstable	1930–1931 (Chatham); 1933–1937 (Barnstable)	7	2	1934, 1937 (Barnstable)
Freddie Moncewicz	Hyannis	1926–1927; 1929–1930	4	2	1926, 1927
* Season count excludes 2020 CCBL season cancelled due to coronavirus pandemic.

Key
CCBL Hall of Fame Inductee

== All-Star Game ==
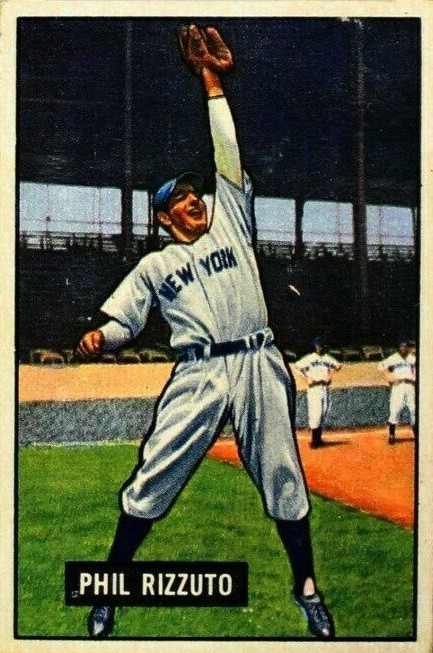
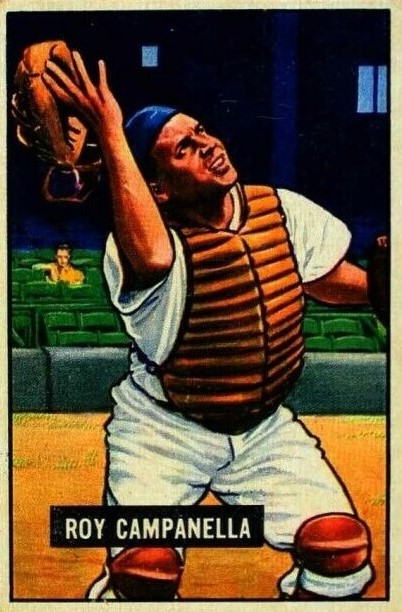
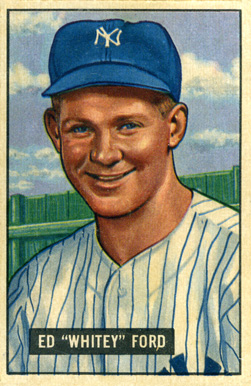
Baseball Hall of Famers Phil Rizzuto, Roy Campanella, and Whitey Ford were on hand at the 1961 CCBL All-Star Game.

The first CCBL All-Star Game took place in 1946, as a squad of Cape League stars battled a collection of Boston Red Sox tryout players. Throughout the Upper and Lower Cape League era (1946–1962), the two divisions routinely featured both intra-divisional all-star contests, as well as an annual inter-divisional CCBL All-Star Game. From 1957 to 1961, the CCBL All-Star Game was sponsored by P. Ballantine and Sons Brewing Company. Ballantine was a major advertising sponsor of the New York Yankees, and arranged for appearances at the CCBL festivities by Yankee alumni including Phil Rizzuto, Elston Howard, Whitey Ford, Moose Skowron, Bill Stafford, Eddie Lopat, and Mel Allen, as well as Brooklyn Dodgers great Roy Campanella.

As the league's modern era began, the All-Star Game continued to be contested between the CCBL's Upper Cape (western) and Lower Cape (eastern) divisions from 1963 to 1969. In 1963, an additional All-Star Game was played by a team from the CCBL against a team from the southeastern Massachusetts-based Cranberry League. The game was played at Keith Field in Sagamore, and the CCBL came out on top, 15–2.

From 1970 to 1987, a team of stars from the CCBL played an annual interleague All-Star Game against stars from the Atlantic Collegiate Baseball League (ACBL). The games were typically played at major league stadiums including Fenway Park, Yankee Stadium and Shea Stadium in New York, and Philadelphia's Veterans Stadium.

Since 1988, the All-Star Game has been contested between stars representing the CCBL's East and West divisions, and has also featured a pre-game home run hitting contest. The event is normally held at one of the CCBL home fields, though it returned to Fenway Park for a three-year stretch from 2009 to 2011.

== Annual award winners ==
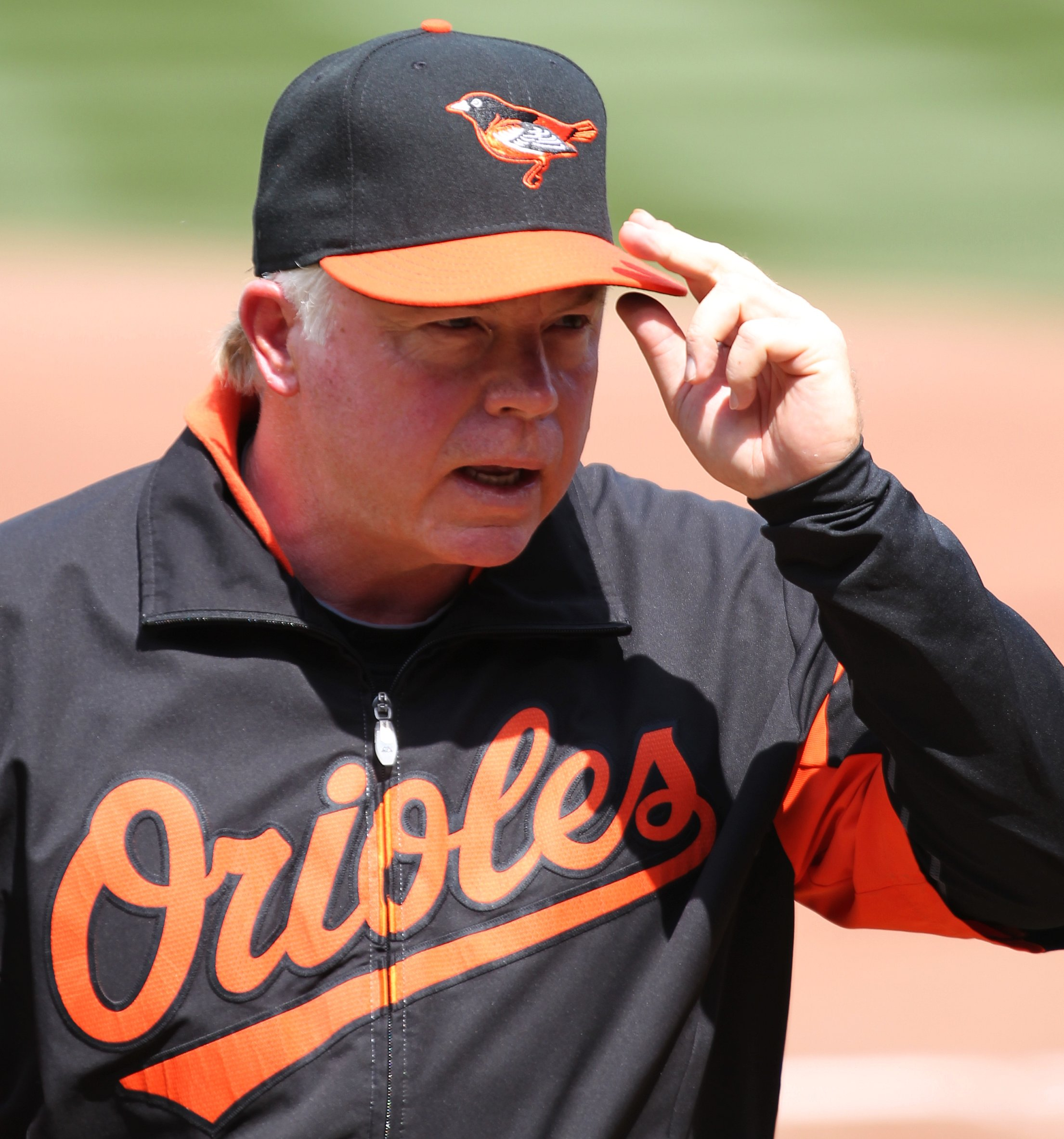
CCBL Hall of Famer and 1976 league MVP Nat "Buck" Showalter won the league batting title with a .434 average

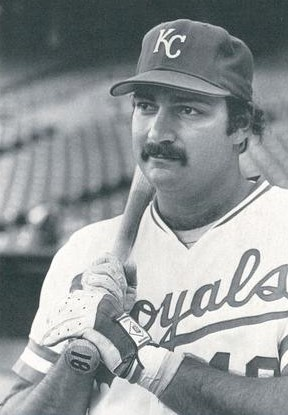
CCBL Hall of Famer Steve Balboni, 1977 league MVP and Outstanding Pro Prospect

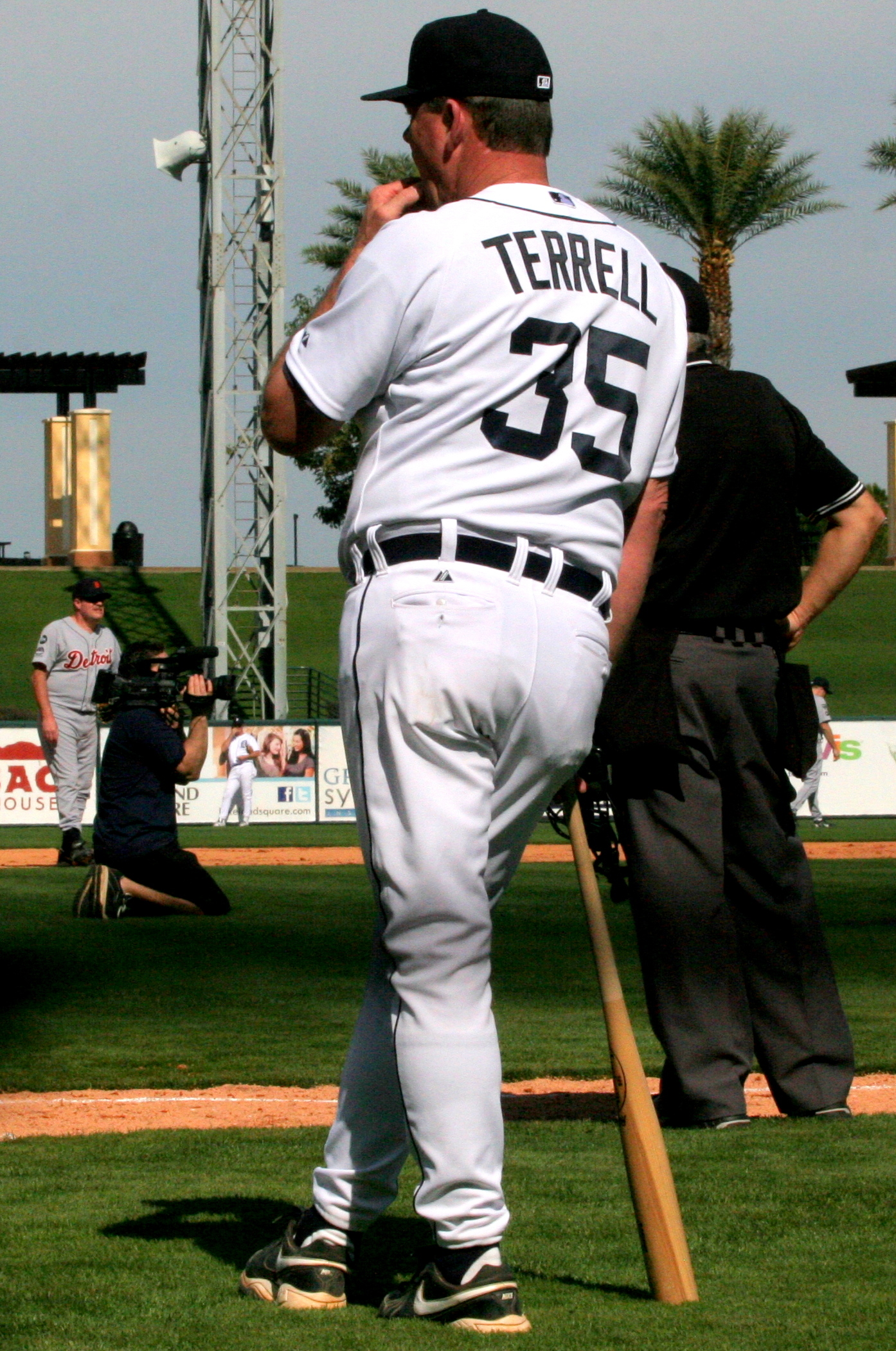
CCBL Hall of Famer Walt Terrell was the league's Outstanding Pitcher in 1979

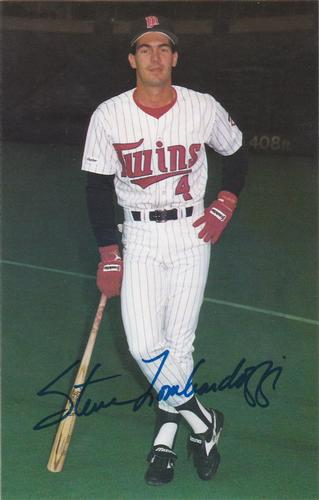
Steve Lombardozzi, 1980 Sportsmanship Award winner

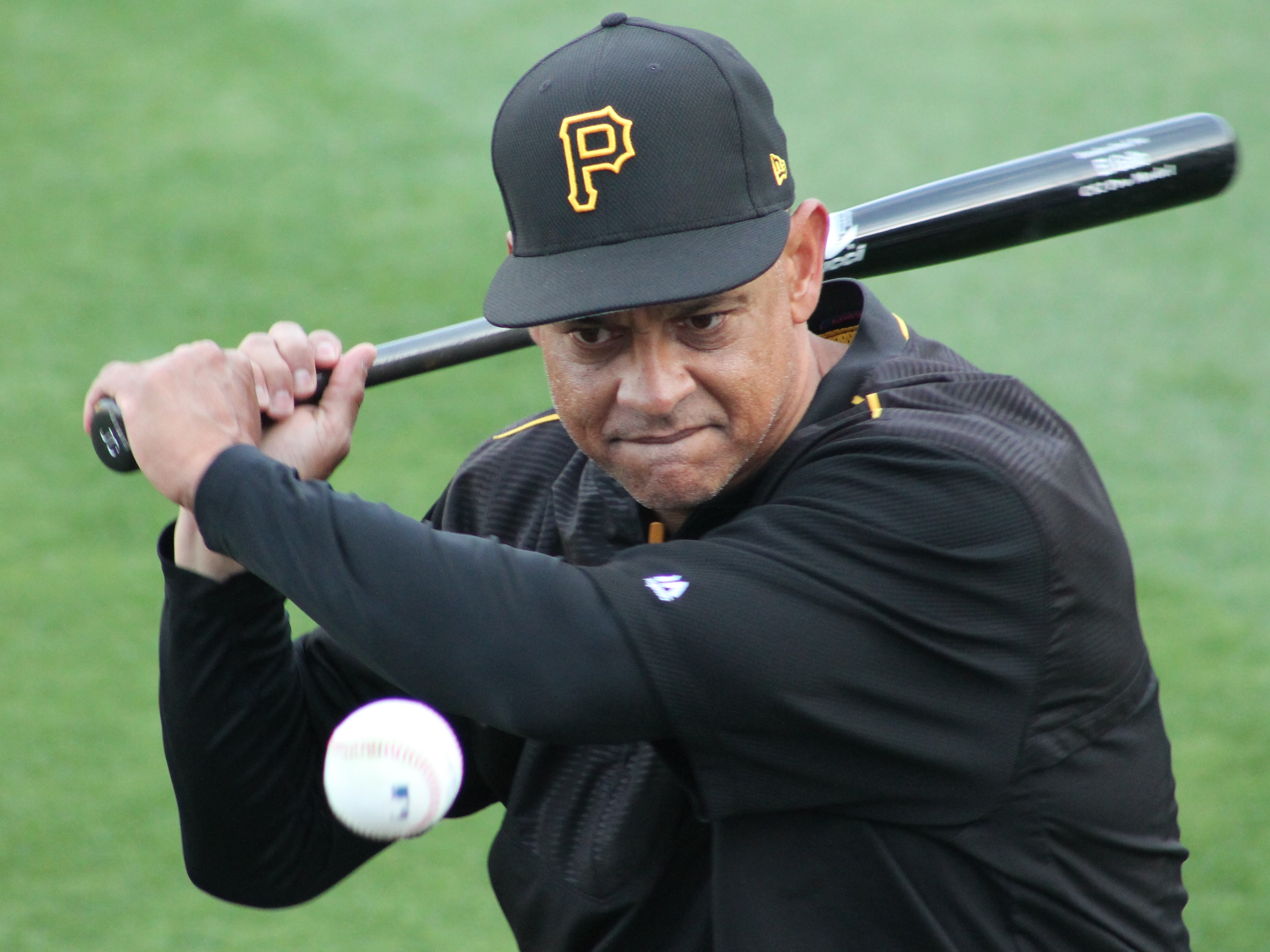
CCBL Hall of Famer Joey Cora was league MVP in 1984

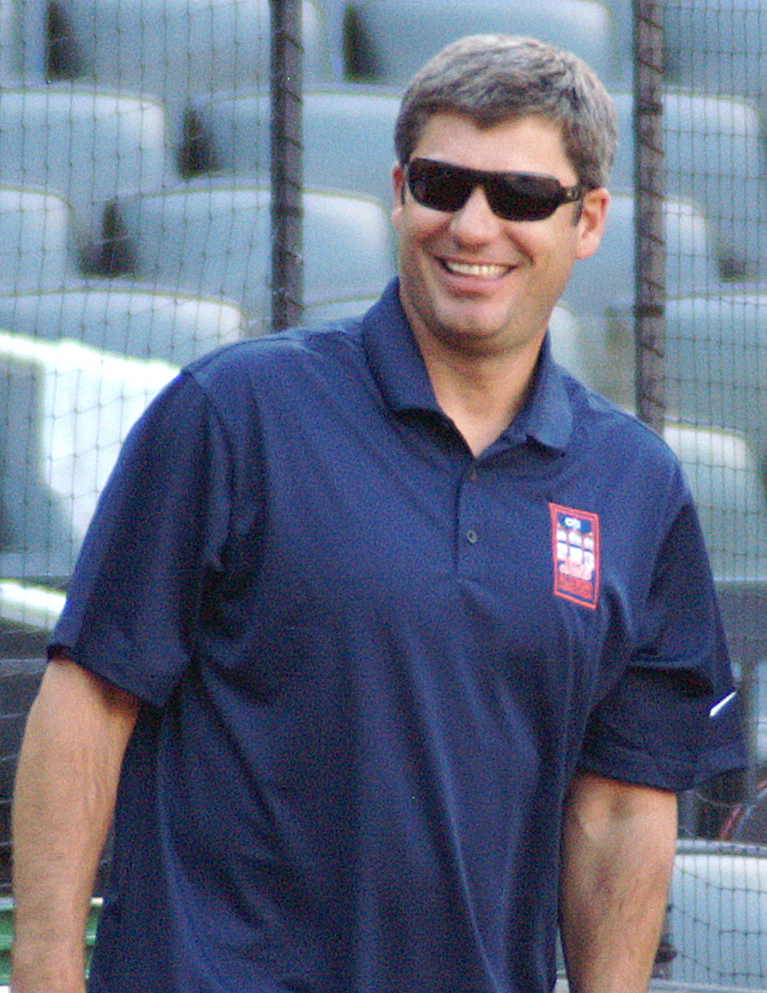
CCBL Hall of Famer Robin Ventura, 1987 Outstanding Pro Prospect Award winner

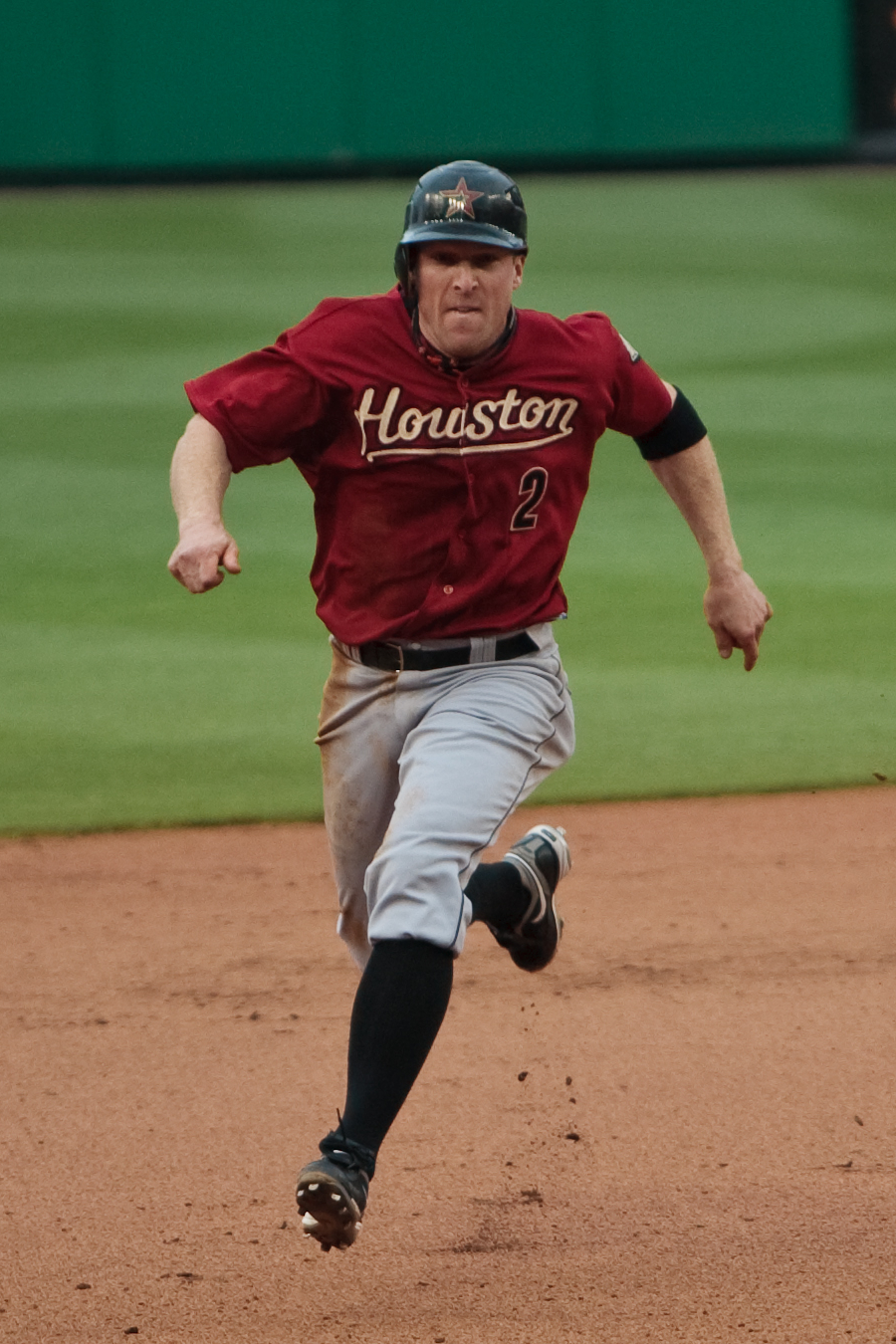
CCBL Hall of Famer Darin Erstad, 1994 league MVP

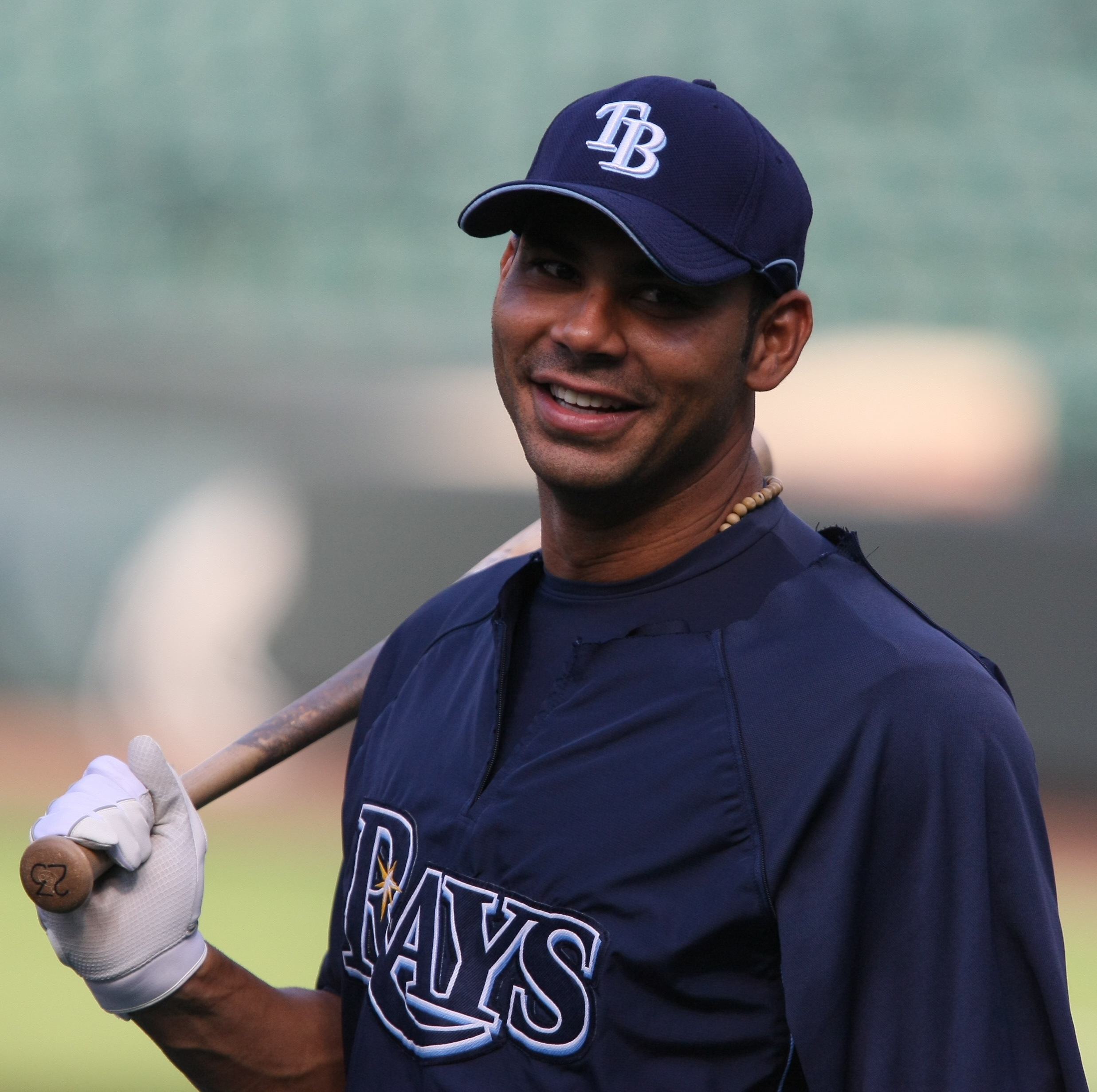
CCBL Hall of Famer Carlos Peña, 1997 league MVP and Sportsmanship Award winner

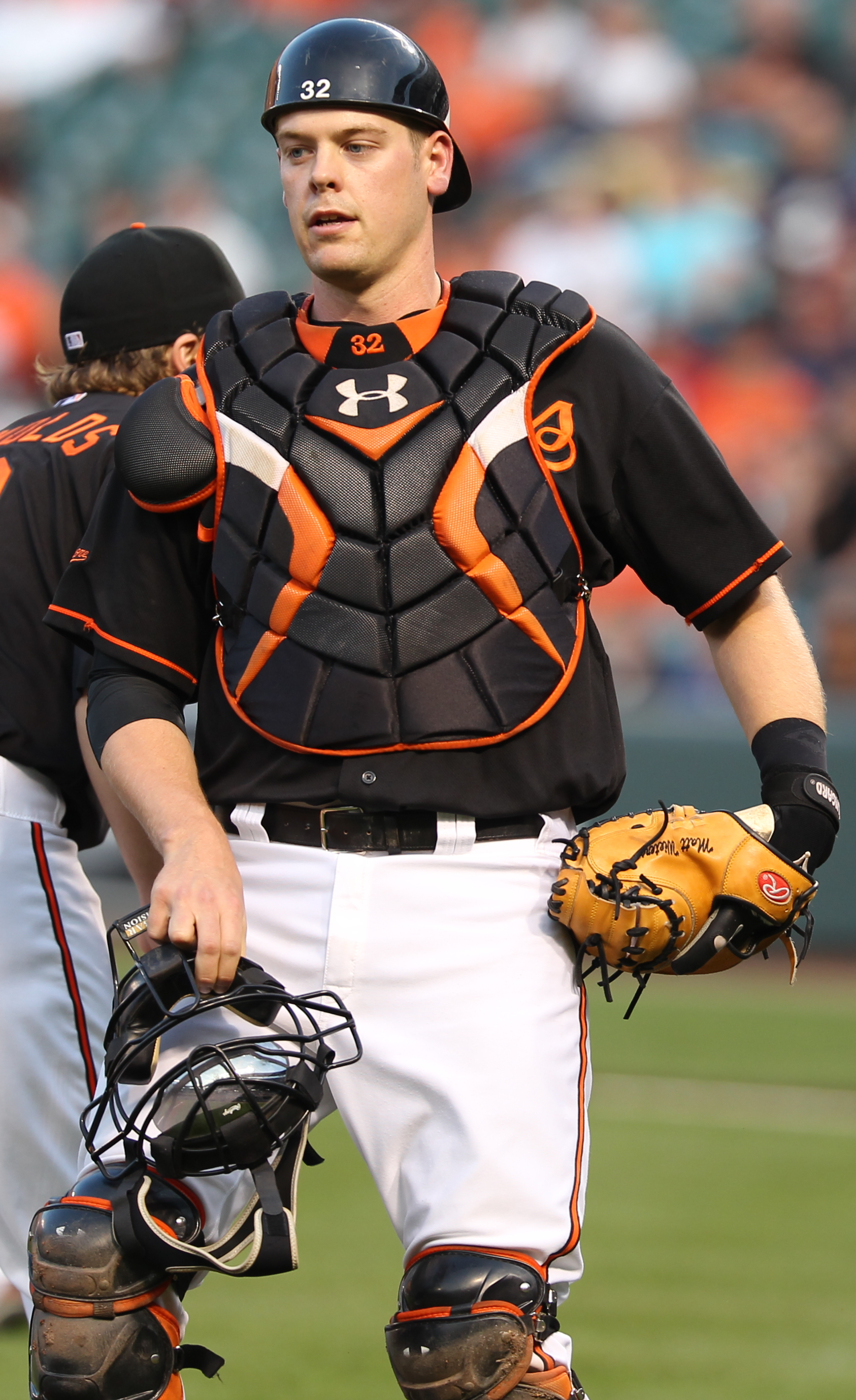
CCBL Hall of Famer Matt Wieters, 2006 Outstanding Pro Prospect Award winner

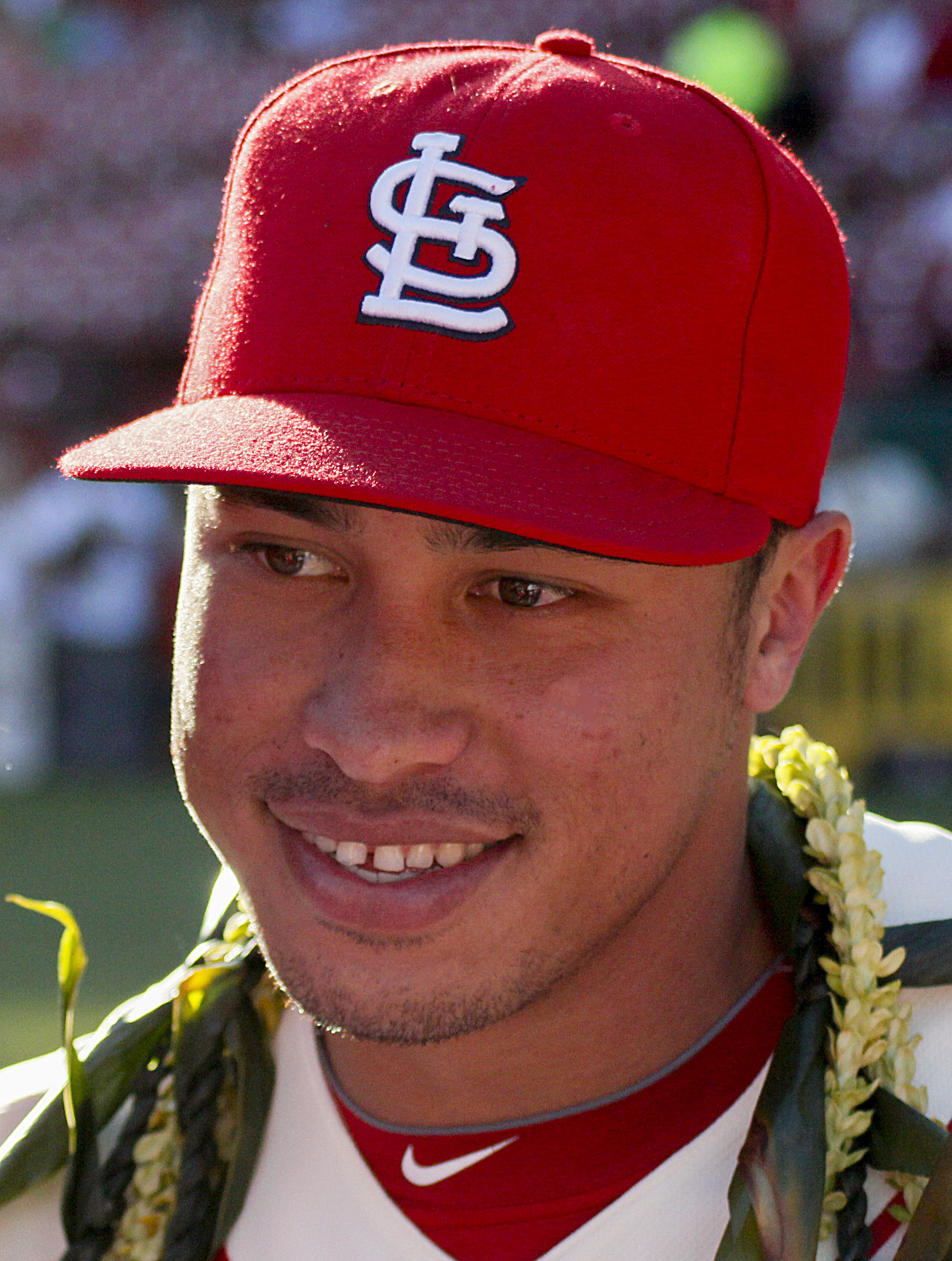
CCBL Hall of Famer Kolten Wong was league MVP in 2010

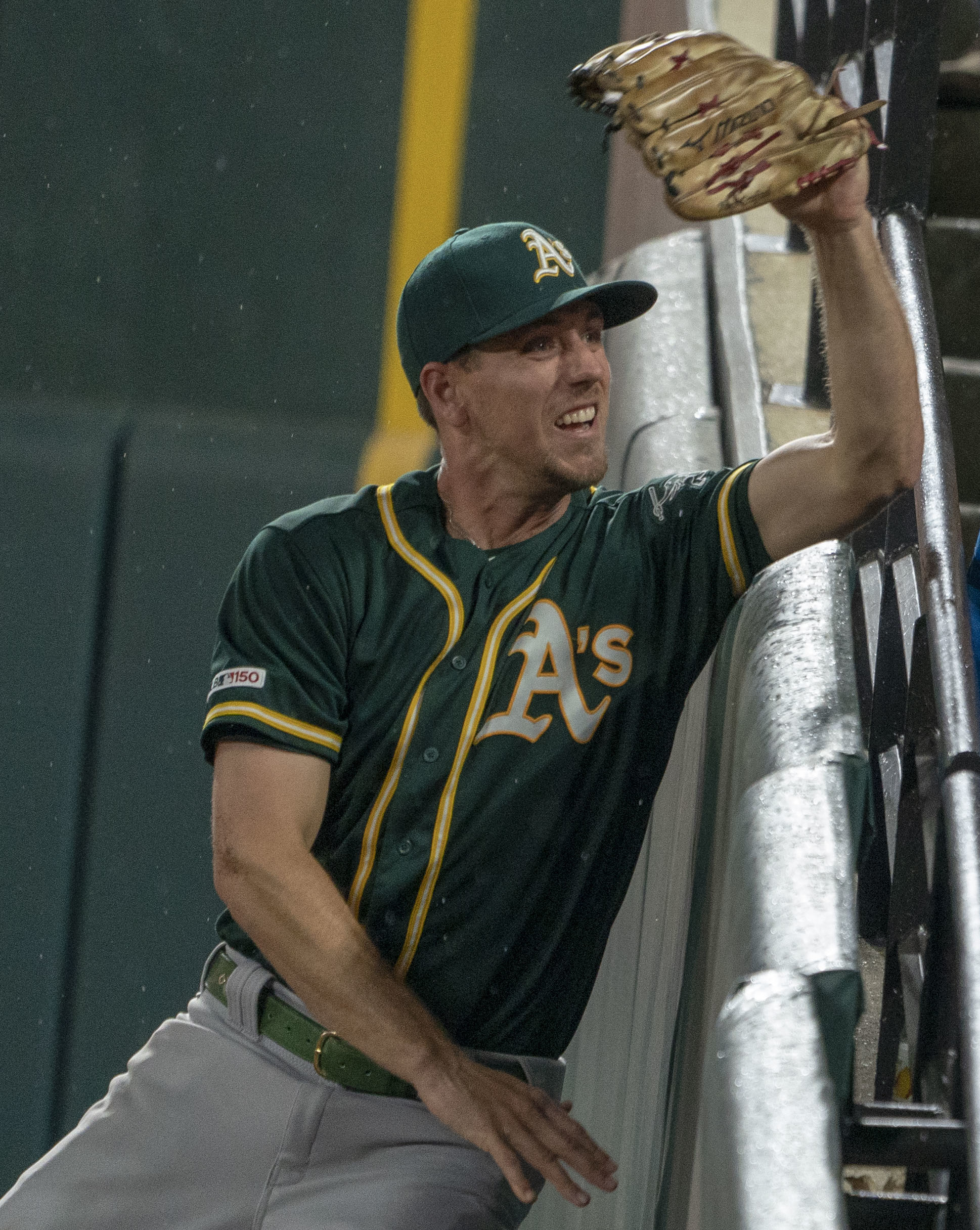
Stephen Piscotty was CCBL batting champ in 2011

The league annually presents several individual awards, including:

- The Pat Sorenti MVP Award
- The Robert A. McNeece Outstanding Pro Prospect Award
- The BFC Whitehouse Outstanding Pitcher Award
- The Russ Ford Outstanding Relief Pitcher Award
- The Daniel J. Silva Sportsmanship Award
- The Manny Robello 10th Player Award
- The John J. Claffey Outstanding New England Player Award
- The Thurman Munson Award for Batting Champion

Annual Award Winners, 1963–present
Year	MVP	Outstanding Pro Prospect	Outstanding Pitcher	Outstanding Relief Pitcher	Sportsmanship	10th Player	Outstanding New Englander	Batting Champ
1963	Not Awarded	Not Awarded	Not Awarded	Not Awarded	Not Awarded	Not Awarded	Not Awarded	Ken Voges; Chatham (.505)
1964	Ken Huebner; Cotuit	Not Awarded	Bernie Kilroy; Cotuit	Not Awarded	Not Awarded	Not Awarded	Not Awarded	Harry Nelson; Bourne (.390)
1965	Ron Bugbee; Sagamore	Not Awarded	Noel Kinski; Sagamore	Not Awarded	Not Awarded	Not Awarded	Not Awarded	John Awdycki; Orleans (.407)
1966	Ed Drucker; Harwich	Not Awarded	Joe Jabar; Chatham	Not Awarded	Not Awarded	Not Awarded	Not Awarded	Tom Weir; Chatham (.420)
1967	Thurman Munson; Chatham	Not Awarded	Joe Jabar; Chatham	Not Awarded	Not Awarded	Not Awarded	Not Awarded	Thurman Munson; Chatham (.420)
1968	Dick Licini; Bourne	Not Awarded	Phil Corddry; Orleans	Not Awarded	Not Awarded	Not Awarded	Not Awarded	Dick Licini; Bourne (.382)
1969	Jim Norris; Orleans	Not Awarded	Paul Mitchell; Falmouth	Not Awarded	Not Awarded	Not Awarded	Not Awarded	Jim Norris; Orleans (.415)
	MVP	Pro Prospect	Pitcher	Relief Pitcher	Sportsmanship	10th Player	New Englander	Batting Champ
1970	Jim Prete; Wareham	Not Awarded	Paul Mitchell; Falmouth	Not Awarded	Not Awarded	Not Awarded	Not Awarded	Mike Eden; Orleans (.378)
1971	Joe Barkauskas; Wareham	Not Awarded	Bob Majczan; Wareham	Not Awarded	Not Awarded	Not Awarded	Not Awarded	Ken Doria; Chatham (.346)
1972	Brad Linden; Orleans	Not Awarded	John Caneira; Bourne	Not Awarded	Not Awarded	Not Awarded	Not Awarded	Ed Orrizzi; Falmouth (.372)
1973	Steve Newell; Wareham	Not Awarded	John Caneira; Chatham	Not Awarded	Jeff Washington; Orleans	Not Awarded	Not Awarded	Dave Bergman; Chatham (.341)
1974	Phil Welch; Wareham	Not Awarded	Andy Muhlstock; Harwich	Not Awarded	Jim Foxwell; Wareham	Not Awarded	Not Awarded	Pete Ross; Yarmouth (.357)
1975	Paul O'Neill; Cotuit	Not Awarded	Jerry Hoffman; Wareham	Not Awarded	Ed Kuchar; Orleans	Not Awarded	Not Awarded	Paul O'Neill; Cotuit (.358)
1976	Nat Showalter; Hyannis	Bobby Sprowl; Wareham	Mickey O'Connor; Chatham	Not Awarded	Joe Gurascio; Chatham	Not Awarded	Not Awarded	Nat Showalter; Hyannis (.434)
1976	Nat Showalter; Hyannis	Steve Taylor; Chatham	Mickey O'Connor; Chatham	Not Awarded	Joe Gurascio; Chatham	Not Awarded	Not Awarded	Nat Showalter; Hyannis (.434)
1977	Steve Balboni; Y-D	Steve Balboni; Y-D	Karl Steffen; Wareham	Not Awarded	Russ Quetti; Chatham	Not Awarded	Not Awarded	Del Bender; Cotuit (.395)
1977	Steve Balboni; Y-D	Brian Denman; Cotuit	Karl Steffen; Wareham	Not Awarded	Russ Quetti; Chatham	Not Awarded	Not Awarded	Del Bender; Cotuit (.395)
1978	Bill Schroeder; Hyannis	Bill Schroeder; Hyannis	Chuck Dale; Orleans	Not Awarded	Gary Cicatiello; Falmouth	Not Awarded	Not Awarded	Randy LaVigne; Cotuit (.370)
1978	Bill Schroeder; Hyannis	Bill Schroeder; Hyannis	Chuck Dale; Orleans	Not Awarded	Randy LaVigne; Cotuit	Not Awarded	Not Awarded	Randy LaVigne; Cotuit (.370)
1979	Ron Perry Jr. Hyannis	Ross Jones; Hyannis	Walt Terrell; Chatham	Not Awarded	Gary Kaczor; Harwich	Not Awarded	Not Awarded	Ross Jones; Hyannis (.407)
1979	Ron Perry Jr. Hyannis	Ross Jones; Hyannis	Walt Terrell; Chatham	Not Awarded	John McDonald; Wareham	Not Awarded	Not Awarded	Ross Jones; Hyannis (.407)
	MVP	Pro Prospect	Pitcher	Relief Pitcher	Sportsmanship	10th Player	New Englander	Batting Champ
1980	Ron Darling; Cotuit	Ron Darling; Cotuit	Joe Pursell; Cotuit	Not Awarded	Steve Lombardozzi; Falmouth	Not Awarded	Not Awarded	Brick Smith; Hyannis (.391)
1980	Ron Darling; Cotuit	Ron Darling; Cotuit	Joe Pursell; Cotuit	Not Awarded	Brick Smith; Hyannis	Not Awarded	Not Awarded	Brick Smith; Hyannis (.391)
1981	John Morris; Wareham	Wade Rowdon; Orleans	Greg Myers; Harwich	Not Awarded	Joe Sickles; Y-D	Not Awarded	Not Awarded	Sam Nattile; Falmouth (.443)
1981	John Morris; Wareham	Wade Rowdon; Orleans	Greg Myers; Harwich	Not Awarded	Gary Melillo; Wareham	Not Awarded	Not Awarded	Sam Nattile; Falmouth (.443)
1981	John Morris; Wareham	Wade Rowdon; Orleans	Greg Myers; Harwich	Not Awarded	Jim Sherman; Chatham	Not Awarded	Not Awarded	Sam Nattile; Falmouth (.443)
1982	Terry Steinbach; Cotuit	Gary Kanwisher; Chatham	Scott Murray; Harwich	Not Awarded	Jeff Innis; Cotuit	Not Awarded	Not Awarded	Terry Steinbach; Cotuit (.431)
1983	Greg Lotzar; Cotuit	Cory Snyder; Harwich	Dennis Livingston; Wareham	Not Awarded	Jim Howard; Hyannis	Not Awarded	Not Awarded	Greg Lotzar; Cotuit (.414)
1984	Joey Cora; Chatham	Mike Loggins; Harwich	Bill Cunningham; Wareham	Not Awarded	Tom Hildebrand; Cotuit	Not Awarded	Not Awarded	Jim McCollom; Falmouth (.413)
1985	Greg Vaughn; Cotuit	John Ramos; Cotuit	John Howes; Orleans	Not Awarded	Dan Arendas; Wareham	Not Awarded	Not Awarded	Tim McIntosh; Chatham (.392)
1985	Greg Vaughn; Cotuit	John Ramos; Cotuit	John Howes; Orleans	Not Awarded	Casey Close; Harwich	Not Awarded	Not Awarded	Tim McIntosh; Chatham (.392)
1986	Scott Hemond; Harwich	Cris Carpenter; Cotuit	Jack Armstrong; Wareham	Not Awarded	Jim DePalo; Chatham	Scott Coolbaugh; Chatham	Not Awarded	Scott Hemond; Harwich (.358)
1987	Mickey Morandini; Y-D	Robin Ventura; Hyannis	Pat Hope; Hyannis	Not Awarded	Mike Hensley; Wareham	Tom Aldrich; Hyannis	Not Awarded	Mickey Morandini; Y-D (.376)
1988	Dave Staton; Brewster	Chuck Knoblauch; Wareham	John Thoden; Wareham	Not Awarded	Will Vespe; Hyannis	Steve O'Donnell; Y-D	Not Awarded	Chuck Knoblauch; Wareham (.361)
1989	Kurt Olson; Y-D	Tyler Green; Hyannis	Mike Hostetler; Cotuit	Not Awarded	Brian Bark; Orleans	Bob Rivell; Bourne	Not Awarded	Bob Rivell; Bourne (.358)
	MVP	Pro Prospect	Pitcher	Relief Pitcher	Sportsmanship	10th Player	New Englander	Batting Champ
1990	Mark Smith; Wareham	Doug Glanville; Wareham	Bill Wissler; Bourne	Not Awarded	Mark Sweeney; Y-D	Chris Demetral; Cotuit	Not Awarded	Mark Smith; Wareham (.408)
1991	Brent Killen; Y-D	Derek Wallace; Chatham	Bill Wissler; Bourne	Brad Clontz; Wareham	Craig Mayes; Falmouth	Jack Stanczak; Wareham	Not Awarded	Mike Hickey; Wareham (.366)
1992	Rick Ellstrom; Cotuit	Billy Wagner; Brewster	John Kelly; Cotuit	Scott Smith; Chatham	Lou Merloni; Cotuit	Steve Hirschman; Falmouth	Not Awarded	Lou Merloni; Cotuit (.321)
1993	Jason Varitek; Hyannis	Chris Clemons; Y-D	Andy Taulbee; Y-D	Don Nestor; Falmouth	Paul Ottavinia; Chatham	Nomar Garciaparra; Orleans	Not Awarded	Jason Varitek; Hyannis (.371)
1994	Darin Erstad; Falmouth	Dave Shepard; Orleans	Bob St. Pierre; Falmouth	Scott Winchester; Falmouth	Karl Thompson; Wareham	Matt Quattraro; Harwich	Not Awarded	Jon Petke; Y-D (.379)
1995	Josh Paul; Cotuit	Josh Paul; Cotuit	Eddie Yarnall; Harwich	Brendan Sullivan; Cotuit	Scott Steinmann; Falmouth	Scott Sollmann; Brewster	Not Awarded	Josh Paul; Cotuit (.364)
1995	Josh Paul; Cotuit	Josh Paul; Cotuit	Jason Ramsey; Chatham	Brendan Sullivan; Cotuit	Scott Steinmann; Falmouth	Scott Sollmann; Brewster	Not Awarded	Josh Paul; Cotuit (.364)
1996	Kevin Nicholson; Wareham	Matt Anderson; Chatham	Billy Coleman; Harwich	Drew Fischer; Brewster	Andre Champagne; Falmouth	Jermaine Clark; Chatham	Not Awarded	Lance Berkman; Wareham (.352)
1996	Kevin Nicholson; Wareham	Matt Anderson; Chatham	Billy Coleman; Harwich	Clint Chrysler; Wareham	Andre Champagne; Falmouth	Jermaine Clark; Chatham	Not Awarded	Lance Berkman; Wareham (.352)
1997	Carlos Pena; Wareham	Kip Wells; Brewster	Brent Hoard; Harwich	Chris Aronson; Cotuit	Carlos Pena; Wareham	Alex Santos; Hyannis	Not Awarded	Jason McConnell; Y-D (.345)
1998	Bobby Kielty; Brewster	Kyle Snyder; Chatham	Phil Devey; Wareham	Tim Lavigne; Bourne/Chatham	Ben Johnstone; Brewster	Jeff House; Bourne	Not Awarded	Bobby Kielty; Brewster (.384)
1998	Bobby Kielty; Brewster	Kyle Snyder; Chatham	Jeff Heaverlo; Cotuit	Tim Lavigne; Bourne/Chatham	Ben Johnstone; Brewster	Jeff House; Bourne	Not Awarded	Bobby Kielty; Brewster (.384)
1999	Lance Niekro; Orleans	Mark Teixeira; Orleans	Rik Currier; Chatham	Derrick DePriest; Chatham	Curtis Sapp; Hyannis	James Ramshaw; Cotuit	Not Awarded	Jaime Bubela; Wareham (.370)
1999	Lance Niekro; Orleans	Mark Teixeira; Orleans	Pat Pinkman; Wareham	Derrick DePriest; Chatham	Curtis Sapp; Hyannis	James Ramshaw; Cotuit	Not Awarded	Jaime Bubela; Wareham (.370)
	MVP	Pro Prospect	Pitcher	Relief Pitcher	Sportsmanship	10th Player	New Englander	Batting Champ
2000	Mike Fontenot; Wareham	Bob Brownlie; Falmouth	Dan Krines; Chatham	Taft Cable; Orleans	Bryan Prince; Orleans	John Baker; Y-D	Not Awarded	Steve Stanley; Brewster (.329)
2000	Mike Fontenot; Wareham	Bob Brownlie; Falmouth	Ben Crockett; Wareham	Dan Rich; Brewster	Bryan Prince; Orleans	John Baker; Y-D	Not Awarded	Steve Stanley; Brewster (.329)
2001	Matt Murton; Wareham	Russ Adams; Orleans	Chris Leonard; Wareham	Ryan Speier; Bourne	Bill Peavey; Cotuit	Adam Bourassa; Y-D	Ben Crockett; Wareham	Eric Reed; Wareham (.365)
2002	Pete Stonard; Cotuit	Wes Whisler; Y-D	Brian Rogers; Orleans	Zane Carlson; Chatham	Ryan Hanigan; Orleans	Ryan Hanigan; Orleans	Ryan Hanigan; Orleans	Pete Stonard; Cotuit (.348)
2002	Pete Stonard; Cotuit	Wes Whisler; Y-D	Brian Rogers; Orleans	Shaun Marcum; Harwich	Ryan Hanigan; Orleans	Ryan Hanigan; Orleans	Ryan Hanigan; Orleans	Pete Stonard; Cotuit (.348)
2003	J.C. Holt; Brewster	Wade Townsend; Wareham	Eric Beattie; Bourne	Jarrett Santos; Brewster	Richard Mercado; Hyannis	Justin Maxwell; Bourne	Chris Lambert; Chatham	J.C. Holt; Brewster (.388)
2004	Daniel Carte; Falmouth	Tyler Greene; Orleans	Matt Goyen; Brewster	Kevin Whelan; Wareham	Chris Robinson; Hyannis	Cliff Pennington; Falmouth	Frank Curreri; Y-D	Ryan Patterson; Brewster (.327)
2005	Evan Longoria; Chatham	Andrew Miller; Chatham	Andrew Miller; Chatham	Steven Wright; Orleans	Joel Collins; Wareham	Brad Lincoln; Bourne	Tim Norton; Falmouth	Chris Coghlan; Chatham (.346)
2005	Evan Longoria; Chatham	Andrew Miller; Chatham	Tim Norton; Falmouth	Steven Wright; Orleans	Joel Collins; Wareham	Brad Lincoln; Bourne	Tim Norton; Falmouth	Chris Coghlan; Chatham (.346)
2006	Justin Smoak; Cotuit	Matt Wieters; Orleans	Terry Doyle; Y-D	Joshua Fields; Y-D	Matt LaPorta; Brewster	Andrew Walker; Falmouth	Charlie Furbush; Hyannis	Matt Mangini; Hyannis (.310)
2006	Justin Smoak; Cotuit	Matt Wieters; Orleans	Shaun Seibert; Brewster	Joshua Fields; Y-D	Matt LaPorta; Brewster	Andrew Walker; Falmouth	Charlie Furbush; Hyannis	Matt Mangini; Hyannis (.310)
2007	Conor Gillaspie; Falmouth	Aaron Crow; Falmouth	Tom Milone; Chatham	Nick Cassavechia; Y-D	Shea Robin; Hyannis	Nate Freiman; Orleans	Bill Perry; Bourne	Conor Gillaspie; Falmouth (.345)
2008	A.J. Pollock; Falmouth	Grant Green; Chatham	Nick McCully; Bourne	Russell Brewer; Hyannis	Kevin Patterson; Cotuit	Andrew Giobbi; Harwich	Ryan Quigley; Harwich	Jimmy Cesario; Falmouth (.387)
2009	Kyle Roller; Bourne	Todd Cunningham; Falmouth	Chris Sale; Y-D	Tyler Burgoon; Y-D	Pierre LePage; Bourne	Pierre LePage; Bourne	Mickey Wiswall; Y-D	Todd Cunningham; Falmouth (.378)
	MVP	Pro Prospect	Pitcher	Relief Pitcher	Sportsmanship	10th Player	New Englander	Batting Champ
2010	Kolten Wong; Orleans	Tony Zych; Bourne	Grayson Garvin; Bourne	Tony Zych; Bourne	Joe Panik; Y-D	Clint Moore; Harwich	Matt Watson; Y-D	John Ruettiger; Hyannis (.369)
2011	Travis Jankowski; Bourne	Victor Roache; Cotuit	Ryan Eades; Bourne	Trevor Gott; Orleans	Patrick Cantwell; Bourne	Ben Waldrip; Orleans	Nate Koneski; Falmouth	Stephen Piscotty; Y-D (.349)
2012	Phil Ervin; Harwich	Sean Manaea; Hyannis	Sean Manaea; Hyannis	Dan Slania; Cotuit	Zak Blair; Y-D	Jake Hernandez; Orleans	Tyler Horan; Wareham	Patrick Biondi; Cotuit (.388)
2013	Max Pentecost; Bourne	Jeff Hoffman; Hyannis	Lukas Schiraldi; Chatham	Eric Eck; Hyannis	Connor Joe; Chatham	Matt Troupe; Orleans	Tommy Lawrence; Chatham	Kevin Newman; Falmouth (.375)
2014	Kevin Newman; Falmouth	Phil Bickford; Y-D	Kolton Mahoney; Orleans	Phil Bickford; Y-D	Anthony Hermelyn; Harwich	A.J. Murray; Chatham	Chris Shaw; Chatham	Kevin Newman; Falmouth (.385)
2014	Kevin Newman; Falmouth	Phil Bickford; Y-D	Kolton Mahoney; Orleans	Adam Whitt; Cotuit	Anthony Hermelyn; Harwich	A.J. Murray; Chatham	Chris Shaw; Chatham	Kevin Newman; Falmouth (.385)
2015	Nick Senzel; Brewster	Nick Senzel; Brewster	Mitchell Jordan; Orleans	Austin Conway; Bourne	Will Haynie; Cotuit	Johnny Adams; Harwich	Aaron Civale; Hyannis	Andrew Calica; Wareham (.425)
2015	Nick Senzel; Brewster	Nick Senzel; Brewster	Mitchell Jordan; Orleans	Thomas Hackimer; Brewster	Will Haynie; Cotuit	Johnny Adams; Harwich	Aaron Civale; Hyannis	Andrew Calica; Wareham (.425)
2016	Ernie Clement; Harwich	Michael Gigliotti; Falmouth	Jeff Passantino; Falmouth	Garrett Cave; Hyannis	Johnny Adams; Harwich	Austin Filiere; Harwich	Willy Yahn; Bourne	Cole Freeman; Wareham (.374)
2017	Greyson Jenista; Cotuit	Griffin Conine; Cotuit	Kris Bubic; Y-D	Riley McCauley; Y-D	Josh Breaux; Falmouth	Marty Bechina; Falmouth	Mickey Gasper; Brewster	Tanner Dodson; Wareham (.350)
2017	Greyson Jenista; Cotuit	Griffin Conine; Cotuit	Kris Bubic; Y-D	Ryan Feltner; Bourne	Josh Breaux; Falmouth	Marty Bechina; Falmouth	Mickey Gasper; Brewster	Tanner Dodson; Wareham (.350)
2018	Matthew Barefoot; Hyannis	J.J. Bleday; Orleans	Adam Laskey; Falmouth	Dylan Thomas; Hyannis	Maverick Handley; Falmouth	Andre Lipcius; Harwich	Justin Lasko; Bourne	Matthew Barefoot; Hyannis (.379)
2018	Matthew Barefoot; Hyannis	J.J. Bleday; Orleans	Adam Laskey; Falmouth	Dylan Thomas; Hyannis	Maverick Handley; Falmouth	Andre Lipcius; Harwich	Jacob Wallace; Bourne	Matthew Barefoot; Hyannis (.379)
2019	Nick Gonzales; Cotuit	Austin Wells; Y-D	Ian Bedell; Wareham	Zach Brzykcy; Falmouth	Max Troiani; Orleans	Austin Masel; Falmouth	Jared Shuster; Orleans	Zach DeLoach; Falmouth (.353)
	MVP	Pro Prospect	Pitcher	Relief Pitcher	Sportsmanship	10th Player	New Englander	Batting Champ
2020	Season cancelled due to coronavirus pandemic							
2021	Brock Wilken; Harwich	Chase DeLauter; Orleans	Trey Dombroski; Harwich	Eric Adler; Bourne	Kurtis Byrne; Brewster	Tyler Locklear; Orleans	Matt Donlan; Cotuit	Clark Elliott; Hyannis (.344)
2022	Matt Shaw; Bourne	Tommy Troy; Cotuit	Bryce Warrecker; Orleans	Cam Schuelke; Cotuit	Garrett Guillemette; Orleans	Rikuu Nishida; Hyannis	Jordy Allard; Hyannis	Matt Shaw; Bourne (.360)
2023	Travis Bazzana; Falmouth	Cam Smith; Hyannis	Camron Hill; Cotuit	Sean Matson; Orleans	Hugh Pinkney; Bourne	Derek Clark; Orleans	Tyler MacGregor; Falmouth	Travis Bazzana; Falmouth (.375)
2024	Ethan Petry; Y-D	Ethan Petry; Y-D	Itsuki Takemoto; Orleans	Trevor Moore; Y-D	Tanner Thach; Cotuit	Yohann Dessureault; Wareham	Cam Maldonado; Harwich	Jarren Advincula; Cotuit (.392)
2025	Maika Niu; Falmouth	Jarren Advincula; Cotuit	Tyler Pitzer; Y-D	Steele Murdock; Orleans	Daniel Jackson; Chatham	Jake Schaffner; Hyannis	Kyle Kipp; Brewster	Aiden Robbins; Harwich (.307)
2026	Tyler Smolinski; Harwich	Jacob Lee; Brewster	Angel Cervantes; Chatham	Truitt Web; Hyannis	Rob Rispoli; Chatham	Dane Harvey; Brewster	Colin Larson; Harwich	Andrew Costello; Bourne (.361)

Key
CCBL Hall of Fame Inductee

== Statistical records ==
Individual season records below are for a 42-game regular season from 1963 to 1987 and a 44-game regular season from 1988–present.
Aluminum bats were used from 1975 through 1984.

=== Individual batting, season (1963–present) ===
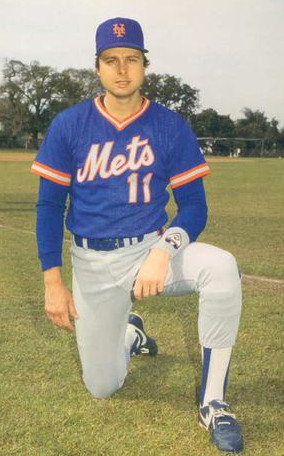
CCBL Hall of Famer Tim Teufel hit 16 home runs and had 52 RBI for Cotuit in 1979.

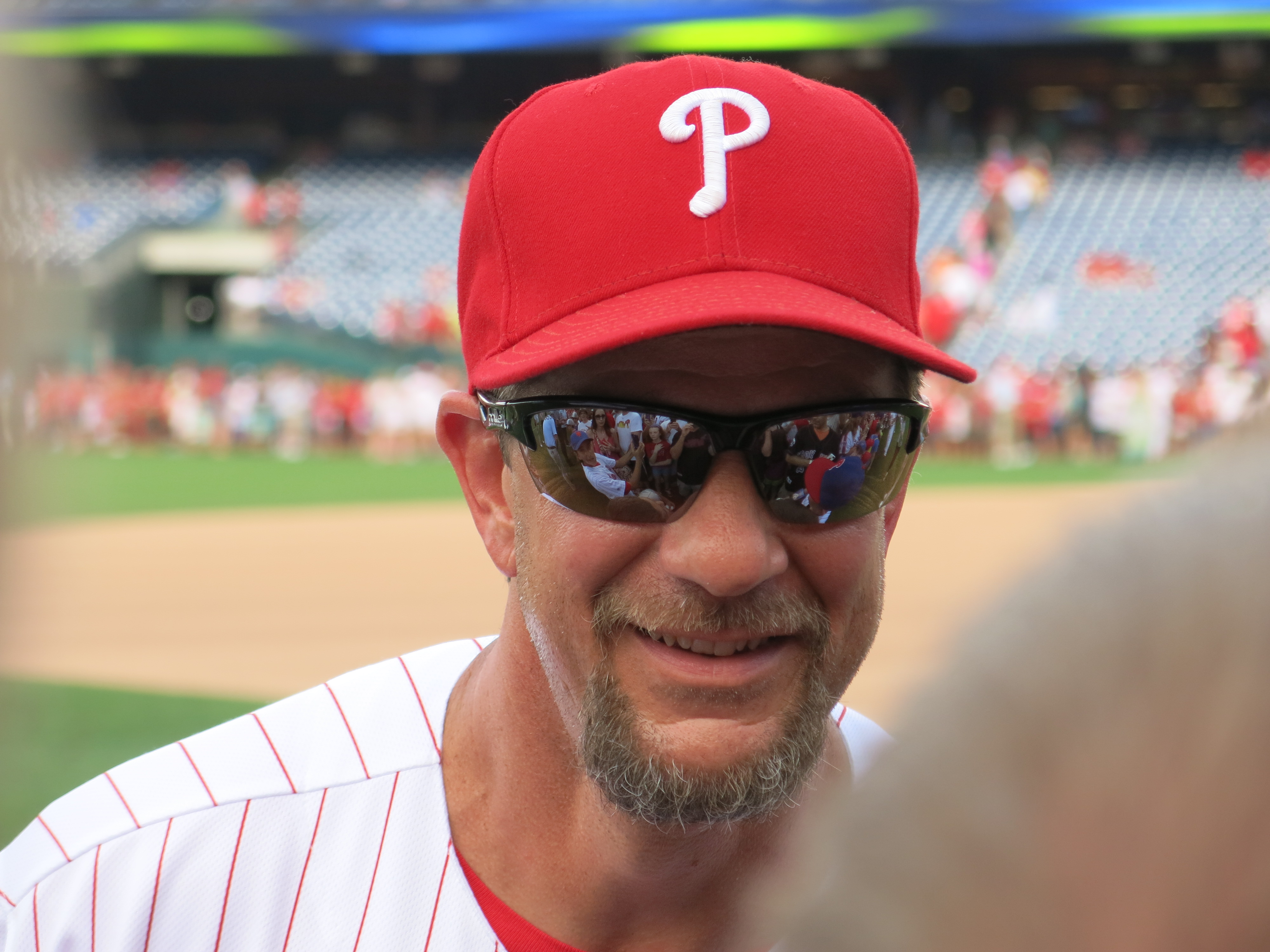
CCBL Hall of Famer Mickey Morandini swiped 43 bases for Y-D in 1987.

Batting Average (AVG)
AVG	Player	Year
.505	Ken Voges, Chatham	1963
.443	Sam Nattile, Falmouth	1981
.434	Nat "Buck" Showalter, Hyannis	1976
.431	Terry Steinbach, Cotuit	1982
.425	Andrew Calica, Wareham	2015
.420	Thurman Munson, Chatham	1967
.420	Tom Weir, Chatham	1966

Home Runs (HR)
HR	Player	Year
22	Cory Snyder, Harwich	1983
16	Tyler Horan, Wareham	2012
16	Dave Staton, Brewster	1988
16	Tim Teufel, Cotuit	1979
15	Jim McCollom, Falmouth	1984
15	Bill Schroeder, Hyannis	1978

Runs Batted In (RBI)
RBI	Player	Year
54	Doug Fisher, Falmouth	1984
54	Terry Steinbach, Cotuit	1982
52	Mike Lopez, Wareham	1982
52	Tim Teufel, Cotuit	1979
51	Chris Morgan, Hyannis	1983

At Bats (AB)
AB	Player	Year
191	Paul Ottavinia, Chatham	1993
189	Don Samra, Wareham	1983
188	Warner Jones, Wareham	2004
186	Warner Jones, Wareham	2003

Runs Scored (R)
R	Player	Year
50	John Morris, Wareham	1981
48	Tim Teufel, Cotuit	1979
47	Cory Snyder, Harwich	1983
47	Ron Perry Jr., Hyannis	1979

Base Hits (H)
H	Player	Year
75	Terry Steinbach, Cotuit	1982
70	Sam Nattile, Falmouth	1981
70	Rod Peters, Harwich	1981
69	Mark Smith, Wareham	1990
69	Ron Perry Jr., Hyannis	1979

Doubles (2B)
2B	Player	Year
19	Dan Olson, Hyannis	1994
19	Walt Weiss, Wareham	1984
18	Kevin Nicholson, Wareham	1996
18	Terry Steinbach, Cotuit	1982

Triples (3B)
3B	Player	Year
8	Bruce Thompson, Hyannis	1993
8	Ed Drucker, Harwich	1966
7	Travis Jankowski, Bourne	2011
7	Jeff Groth, Chatham	1978

Stolen Bases (SB)
SB	Player	Year
48	Roy Marsh, Wareham	1993
47	Jeremy Carr, Chatham	1992
43	Mickey Morandini, Y-D	1987
42	Billy Rapp, Wareham	1986

=== Individual pitching, season (1963–present) ===
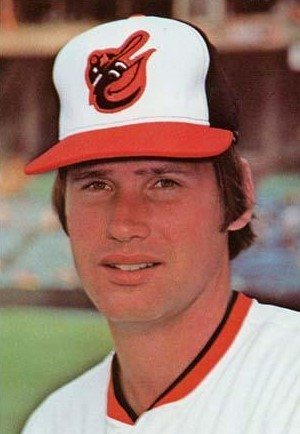
CCBL Hall of Famer Paul Mitchell set a league record with 126 strikeouts for Falmouth in 1969.

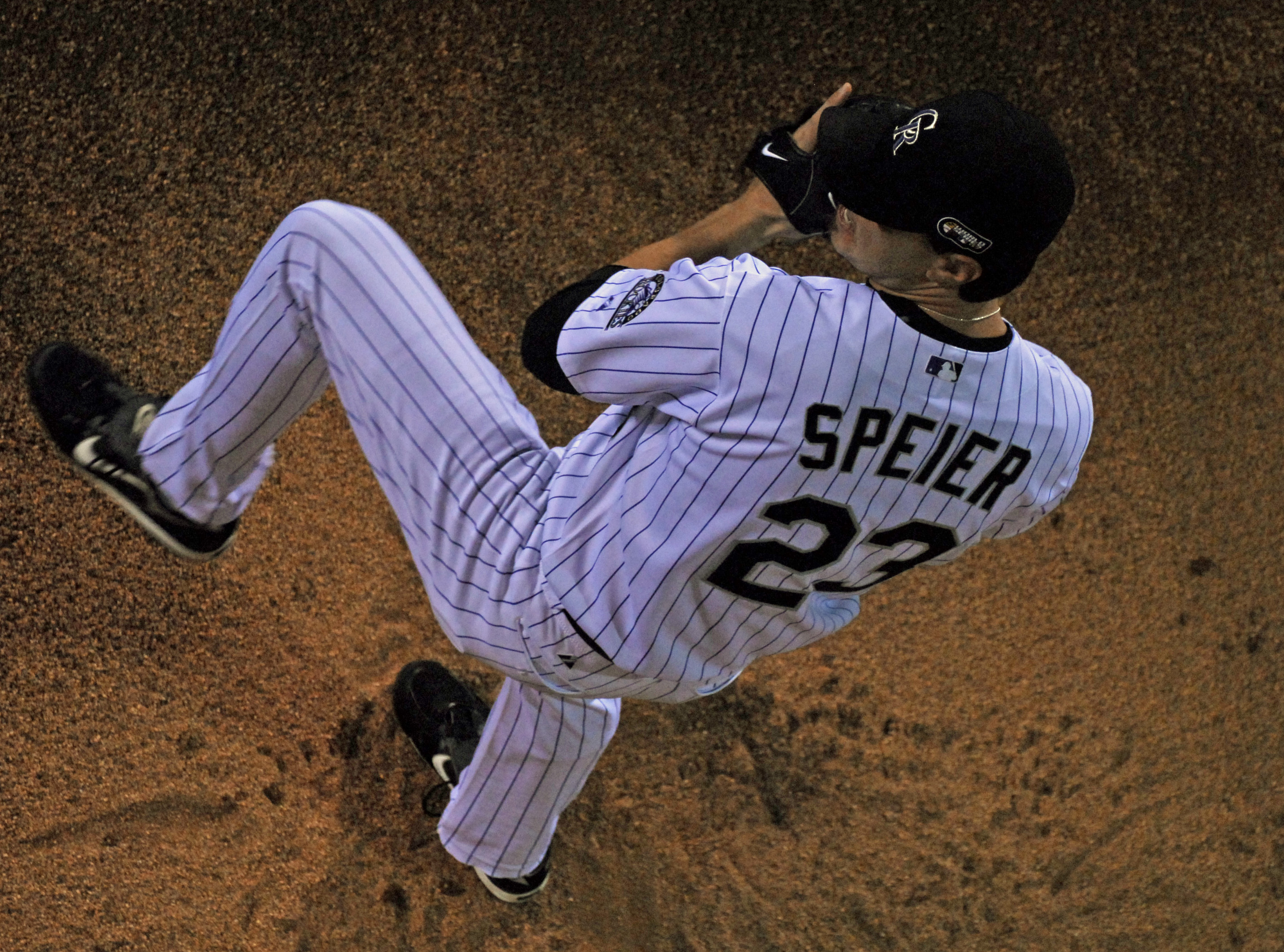
CCBL Hall of Famer Ryan Speier saved 16 games for Bourne in 2001.

Wins (W)
W	Player	Year
11	Pat Hope, Hyannis	1987
10	Noel Kinski, Sagamore	1965
9	(12 players tied)	

Strikeouts (SO)
SO	Player	Year
126	Paul Mitchell, Falmouth	1969
122	Dan O'Brien, Chatham	1974
120	Bill Fuller, Chatham	1972
119	John Caneira, Bourne	1972
118	John Caneira, Chatham	1973

Earned Run Average (ERA)
ERA	Player	Year
0.21	Mitchell Jordan, Orleans	2015
0.21	Eric Milton, Falmouth	1996
0.39	Shaun Seibert, Brewster	2006
0.39	Eric Beattie, Bourne	2003
0.40	Brian Rogers, Orleans	2002
0.43	Jonathan Gonzalez, Wareham	2000
0.45	Ed Baird, Chatham	1965
0.55	Kyle Schmidt, Bourne	2003
Minimum 34 innings pitched

Games (G)
G	Player	Year
30	Jeff Innis, Cotuit	1982
29	Ryan Cahalan, Cotuit	2004
29	Mike Dennison, Bourne	2001
27	Donnie Bivens, Y-D	1996

Innings Pitched (IP)
IP	Player	Year
123	Walt Terrell, Chatham	1979
115	Pat Hope, Hyannis	1987
111	John Caneira, Bourne	1972
110	Dan O'Brien, Chatham	1974
110	Oz Griebel, Harwich	1970

Saves (SV)
SV	Player	Year
16	Ryan Speier, Bourne	2001
15	Derrick DePriest, Chatham	1999
13	Josh Fields, Y-D	2006
13	Clint Chrysler, Wareham	1996
13	Drew Fischer, Brewster	1996
13	Scott Winchester, Falmouth	1994

Key
CCBL Hall of Fame Inductee

== Presidents and commissioners ==
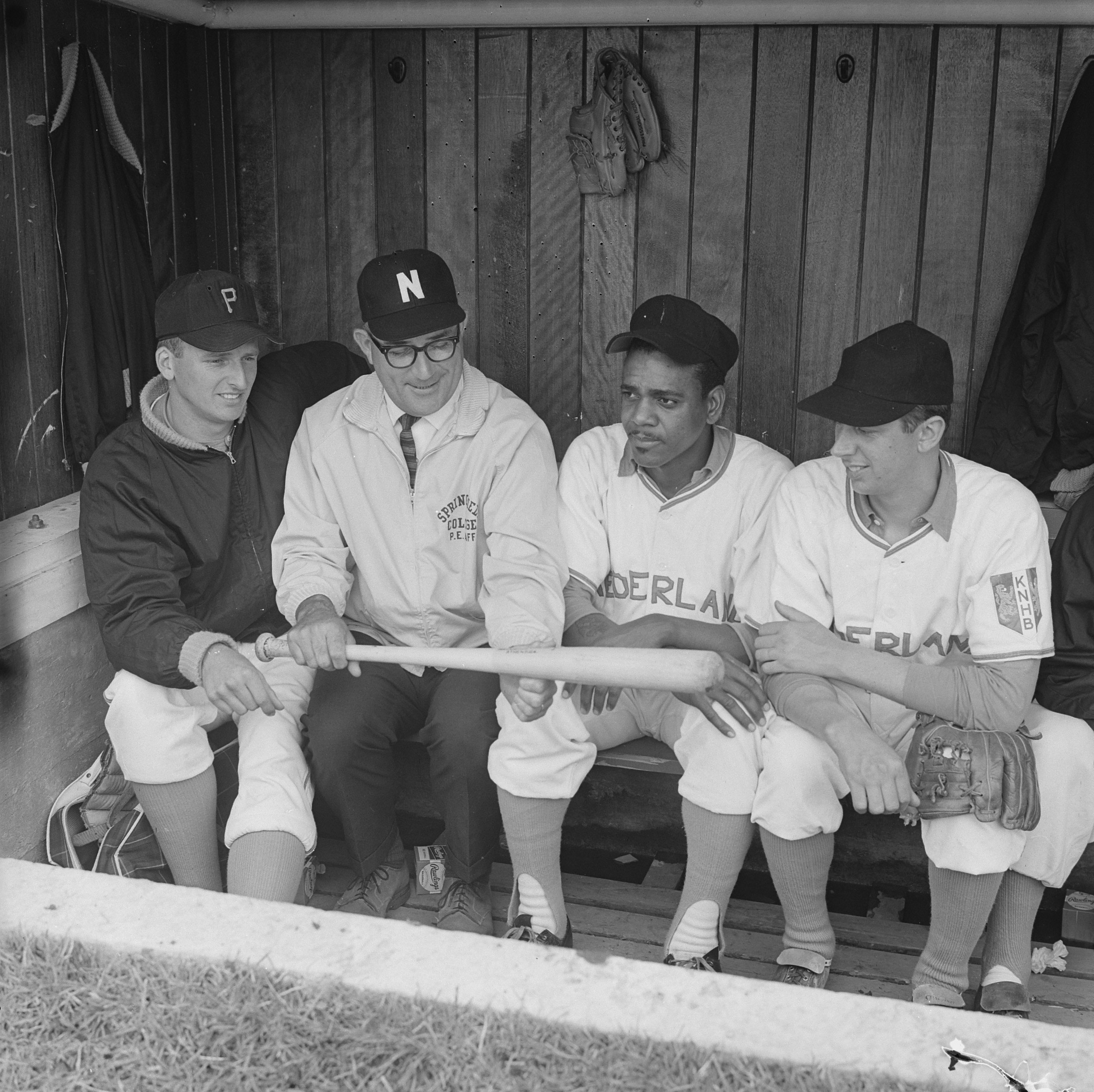
Longtime Springfield College head coach Archie Allen was CCBL Commissioner in 1983. He is shown here coaching the Dutch national team in the 1964 European Baseball Championship.

League Presidents
Years in Office	Name	Ref
1968–1970	Charles F. Moore	
1970–1971	Elwood C. Kastner	
1972–1976	Robert A. McNeece	
1976–1977	Mike Curran	
1978–1983	Russ Ford	
1983–1986	Dick Sullivan	
1986–1987	Chuck Smith	
1988–1989	Dave Mulholland	
1989–1991	John Claffey	
1991–2015	Judy Walden Scarafile	
2015–2022	Chuck Sturtevant	
2023–present	Andrew Lang	

League Commissioners
Years in Office	Name	Ref
1962–1968	Danny Silva	
1968–1970	Bernie Kilroy	
1970–1972	Larry Upton	
1973–1974	George Manfredi	
1974	Robert Kessler	
1975–1978	Dick Sullivan	
1978–1982	G. Arthur Hyland	
1983	Archie Allen	
1983–1996	Fred Ebbett	
1996–1998	Dick Marr	
1999–2003	Bob Stead	
2003–2019	Paul Galop	
2019–2024	Eric Zmuda	
2024–present	John Castleberry	

Key
CCBL Hall of Fame Inductee

== Hall of Fame and Museum ==
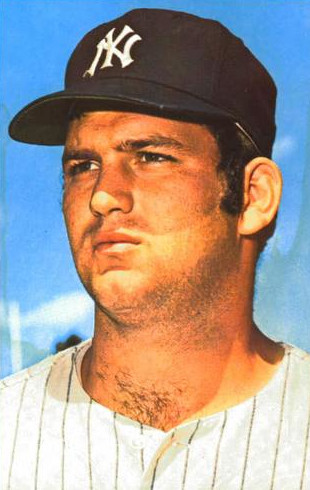
CCBL Hall of Famer Thurman Munson

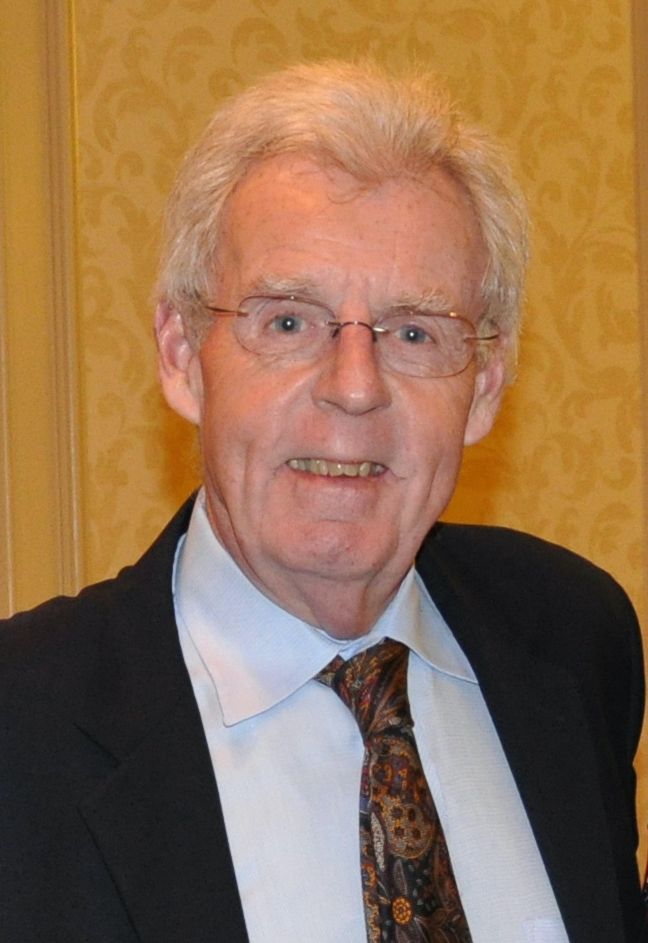
CCBL Hall of Famer Peter Gammons

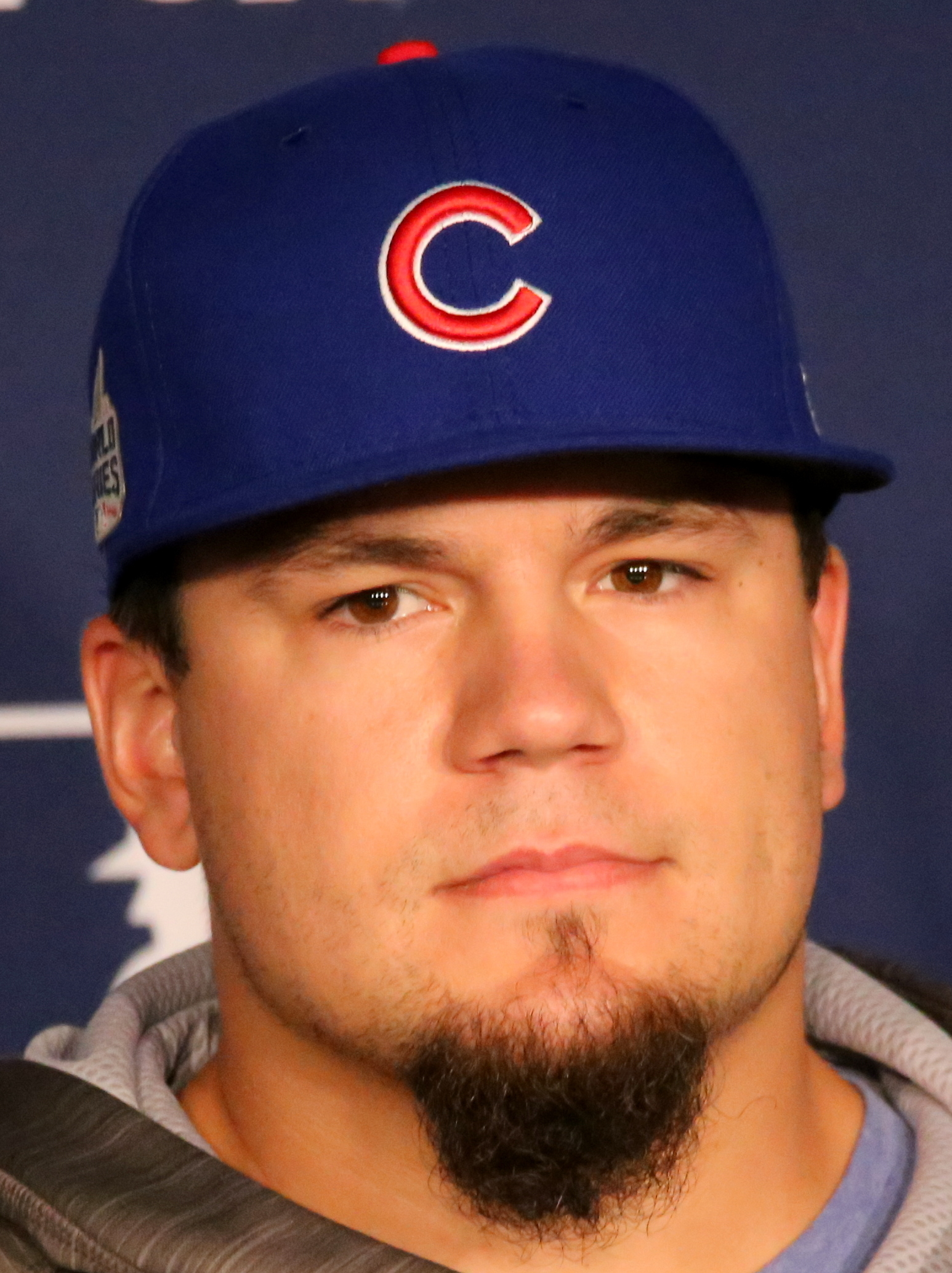
CCBL Hall of Famer Kyle Schwarber

The CCBL Hall of Fame and Museum is a history museum and hall of fame honoring past players, coaches, and others who have made outstanding contributions to the CCBL. Since its inaugural class in 2000, the Hall of Fame has held annual inductions of new members, enshrining over 170 members to date.

Originally opened to the public in 2003 at the Heritage Museums and Gardens in Sandwich, the Hall of Fame and Museum moved in 2008 to the lower level of the John F. Kennedy Hyannis Museum in Hyannis, Massachusetts, where it remained until 2017. The league anticipates a 2024 reopening of the Hall of Fame at a permanent location in South Yarmouth.

Inductees (by year):

- 2000 – Dick Bresciani; Bill Enos; Mike Flanagan; Ed Lyons; Lennie Merullo; Thurman Munson; Arnold Mycock; Jeff Reardon; Danny Silva; Frank Thomas; Mo Vaughn; Merrill "Red" Wilson
- 2001 – Cal Burlingame; Fred Ebbett; Darin Erstad; Chuck Knoblauch; Tony Plansky; Terry Steinbach; Robin Ventura
- 2002 – Curly Clement; Ron Darling; Russ Ford; Nomar Garciaparra; George Greer; George Karras; Bernie Kilroy; Bill Livesey; Paul Mitchell; Buck Showalter; Dick Sullivan; Jason Varitek
- 2003 – Ed Baird; Sean Casey; Joe Jabar; Noel Kinski; Jack McCarthy; Carlos Pena; Jim Perkins; Ron Perry Jr.; Judy Walden Scarafile; Cory Snyder; Pat Sorenti
- 2004 – Roy Bruninghaus; Bob Butkus; John Caneira; Will Clark; Pat Hope; Eric Milton; Jim Norris; Don Reed; Dave Staton; Tello Tontini
- 2005 – Mike Curran; Bobby Kielty; Mickey Morandini; Sam Nattile; Pat Pacillo; Manny Pena; Jack Sanford; Tim Teufel; John Thoden; Ken Voges
- 2006 – Steve Balboni; Rik Currier; Steve Duda; Jim Hubbard; Ross Jones; Greg Lotzar; Lance Niekro; Josh Paul; Allen (Buzzy) Wilcox
- 2007 – Del Bender; Scott Hemond; Dick Licini; John Morris; Steve Saradnik; Bob Schaefer; Walt Terrell; Jack Walsh; John Wylde
- 2008 – Derrick DePriest; Bob Hansen; Jeff Innis; Robert A. McNeece; Matt Murton; Roche Pires; Ben Sheets; Mike Stenhouse
- 2009 – Mark Angelo; John Awdycki; Zane Carlson; Lou Lamoriello; Joe "Skip" Lewis; Joe Magrane; Art Quirk; Bill Schroeder; Pie Traynor; Greg Vaughn
- 2010 – David Aardsma; Casey Close; Jack Cressend; Peter Ford; Wayne Granger; Tom Grieve; Mike Loggins; Lou Merloni; Steve Robbins; Tom Weir
- 2011 – David Bush; Doug Fisher; Scott Kamieniecki; Mike Lowell; Paul O'Neill; Mark Smith; Eric Wedge; Bill Wissler
- 2012 – John "Jack" Aylmer; Billy Best; John Carroll; Dan DeMichele; Danny "Deacon" MacFayden; Andrew Miller; Laurin "Pete" Peterson; Jim Sherman
- 2013 – Garrett Atkins; Daniel Carte; Merrill Doane; Ed Drucker; Mickey O'Connor; Jim Prete; Ryan Speier; Matt Wieters
- 2014 – Eric Beattie; Phil Corddry; Sam Fuld; Donald Hicks Sr.; Bob St. Pierre
- 2015 – (None)
- 2016 – J.C. Holt; Warner Jones; Jim McCollom; Mark Petkovsek; Kyle Roller; Kolten Wong
- 2017 – Joey Cora; Dennis Long; Justin Masterson; Tim McIntosh; Steve Newell; Jeremy Sowers; Chuck Sturtevant; Tom Yankus
- 2018 – Arthur "Ace" Adams; Barbara Ellsworth; Peter Gammons; Craig Hansen; John Schiffner; Mark Sweeney
- 2019 – Paul Galop; Conor Gillaspie; Brad Linden; Chris Overman; Scott Pickler; Kyle Schwarber; Shaun Seibert; Nick Zibelli
- 2020 – Charles P. "Buzz" Bowers; Bob Corradi; Tyler Horan; Harry Nelson; Kevin Newman, Cliff Pennington, Harvey Shapiro; Sol Yas
- 2021 – (None; class of 2020 ceremonies postponed to 2021 due to coronavirus pandemic)
- 2022 – Marcus Stroman; Ian Happ; Billy Wagner; Justin Smoak; Patrick Biondi; Steven Wilson
- 2023 – Lance Berkman; Glenn Davis; Mary Henderson; Jim Higgins; Mitchell Jordan; Max Pentecost
- 2024 – Andrew Calica, Todd Cunningham, Todd Helton, Pat Neshek, Nick Senzel, Brick Smith, Jeff Trundy
- 2025 – Gary Alexander, Nick Gonzales, Travis Jankowski, Pat Pinkman, Bob Stead, Bill Walker
- 2026 – Seth Etherton, John Garner, Matt Goyen, Grant Green, Kevin Nicholson

== Alumni in the National Baseball Hall of Fame ==
The following former CCBL players have been inducted into the National Baseball Hall of Fame in Cooperstown, New York.

In addition to the player inductees below, Cooperstown also honored longtime CCBL president Judy Walden Scarafile in 2010 by featuring her in the museum's Diamond Dreams exhibit, which highlights stories of pioneering women in baseball.

Pie Traynor; 1919 Falmouth/Oak Bluffs; Inducted 1948
Carlton Fisk; 1966 Orleans Cardinals; Inducted 2000
Frank Thomas; 1988 Orleans Cardinals; Inducted 2014
Craig Biggio; 1986 Yarmouth–Dennis Red Sox; Inducted 2015
Jeff Bagwell; 1987 & 1988 Chatham A's; Inducted 2017
Todd Helton; 1994 Orleans Cardinals; Inducted 2024
Billy Wagner; 1992 Brewster Whitecaps; Inducted 2025
Jeff Kent; 1988 Cotuit Kettleers; Inducted 2026

Key
CCBL Hall of Fame Inductee

== See also ==
- Cape Cod Baseball League ballparks
- Cape Cod Baseball League coaches
- Cape Cod Baseball League players
- Cape Cod Baseball League players (pre-modern era)
- List of Collegiate Summer Baseball Leagues
- Summer Catch, a 2001 American romantic comedy film set in the Cape Cod Baseball League.
