= Phoebe Reads a Mystery =

Podcast hosted by Phoebe Judge

Cast and voices
- Hosted by: Phoebe Judge

Production
- Production: Phoebe Judge; Lauren Spohrer

Publication
- Original release: March 2020

Related
- Website: thisiscriminal.com/mystery

Phoebe Reads a Mystery is a podcast created by Phoebe Judge and Lauren Spohrer, producers of Criminal and This is Love. The podcast began airing in March 2020, during the COVID-19 pandemic. Judge opens the first episode by saying, “One thing that’s been making me feel a little more at ease has been reading fiction." Initially billed as "Phoebe reads a chapter a day from a mystery novel," Judge has also read classics that are not mysteries, such as Little Women.

== Critical reception ==
Phoebe Reads a Mystery was included on Elle and Oprah Daily lists of the best podcasts of 2020, as well as on The Gentleman’s Journal’s list of the best podcasts to listen to during lockdown. The podcast has also been recommended on several lists of shows to fall asleep to, including The New York Times’ “6 Podcasts That Will Read You a Bedtime Story.”

== Episodes ==
Title	Author	Date of first episode	Number of episodes
The Mysterious Affair at Styles	Agatha Christie	2020-03-21	13
The Hound of the Baskervilles	Arthur Conan Doyle	2020-04-05	15
The Moonstone	Wilkie Collins	2020-04-02	41
The Murder on the Links	Agatha Christie	2020-06-01	22
The Leavenworth Case	Anna Katharine Green	2020-06-23	32
Dracula	Bram Stoker	2020-08-01	27
Jane Eyre	Charlotte Brontë	2020-09-02	45
The Adventures of Sherlock Holmes	Arthur Conan Doyle	2020-10-19	19
The Secret Adversary	Agatha Christie	2020-11-09	25
The Turn of the Screw	Henry James	2020-12-07	16
Twas the Night Before Christmas	Clement C. Moore	2020-12-24	1
Twenty Thousand Leagues Under the Sea	Jules Verne	2021-01-08	31
The Trail of the Serpent	Mary Elizabeth Braddon	2021-02-14	34
Sense and Sensibility	Jane Austen	2021-03-23	33
The Woman in White	Wilkie Collins	2021-04-28	62
Frankenstein	Mary Shelley	2021-07-05	26
Something New	P. G. Wodehouse	2021-08-06	14
Arsène Lupin	Maurice Leblanc	2021-09-13	23
The Haunted Hotel: A Mystery of Modern Venice	Wilkie Collins	2021-10-11	20
The Scarlet Letter	Nathaniel Hawthorne	2021-11-06	25
Little Women	Louisa May Alcott	2021-12-05	52
The Age of Innocence	Edith Wharton	2022-01-28	34
Moby Dick	Herman Melville	2022-03-07	68
The Valley of Fear	Arthur Conan Doyle	2022-05-23	20
The Strange Case of Dr. Jekyll and Mr. Hyde	Robert Louis Stevenson	2023-10-16	7
The Picture of Dorian Gray	Oscar Wilde	2023-07-31	20
Lady Molly of Scotland Yard	Baroness Orczy	2024-10-28	12
The Little Mermaid	Hans Christian Andersen	2025-06-18	1
The Story of the Three Little Pigs		2025-06-18	1
The Tale of Peter Rabbit	Beatrix Potter	2025-06-18	1
Winnie-the-Pooh	A.A. Milne	2025-07-07	10
Jack and The Beanstalk		2025-09-18	1
Pride and Prejudice	Jane Austen	2025-11-12	18
