= Phoebe Judge =

American journalist

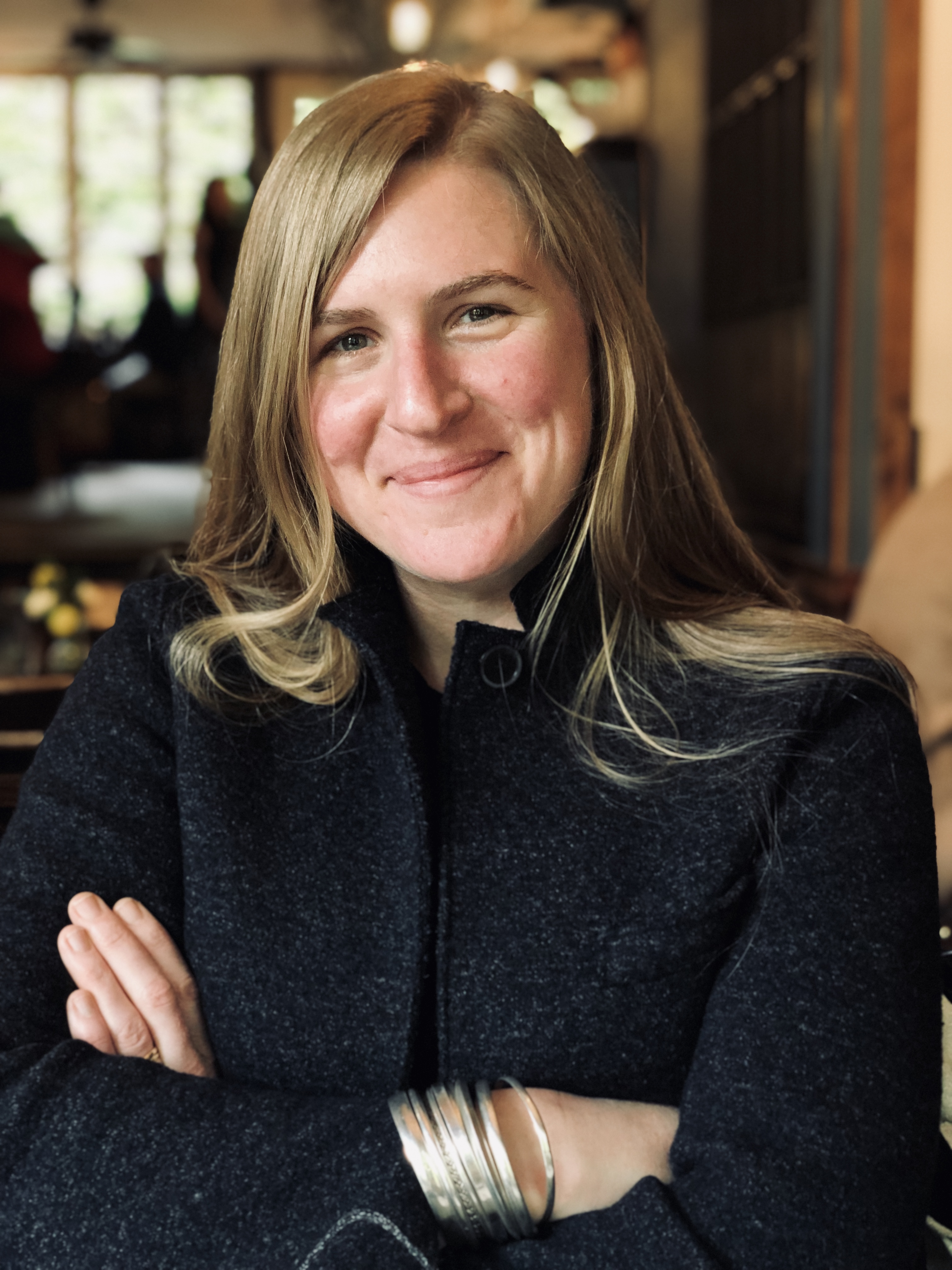
- Judge in 2020
- Born: September 2, 1983 (age 42)
- Education: Bennington College; Salt Institute for Documentary Studies
- Known for: Criminal podcast This Is Love podcast

Phoebe Valentine Judge is an American journalist, best known as the host and co-creator of the podcasts Criminal and This Is Love.

== Early life and education ==
Judge was born to parents Valentine and Tony Judge, and named after her aunt, Phoebe Legere. She grew up in Chicago with her three siblings, and attended university at Bennington College, graduating in 2005. She eventually started interning at a public radio station in Cape Cod, Massachusetts, which led her to enroll at the Salt Institute for Documentary Studies.

== Career ==
After graduating, Judge worked for several years as a journalist for public radio, beginning with a two-and-a-half-year stint working as a reporter for Mississippi Public Broadcasting. She left to go to India to report and produce for a documentary on the country.

What I’ve learned is that you can ask anyone pretty much anything as long as you’re genuinely interested in what they have to say – in their answer. And so I spend a lot of time thinking about my job as an interviewer, and realising that the best thing that I can do as an interviewer is to shut up, and to let someone tell their story.

— Judge, in an interview with Ezra Magazine

After returning from India, Judge landed a job with The Story with Dick Gordon. While planning to do an interview on wrongful imprisonment with her colleagues at North Carolina Public Radio, Judge said, "Very quickly, once we started reading about the number of exonerees, about the number of potentially innocent people in jail ... it was clear that this was going to be more than one show, that this deserved to become a series.” Their investigation became “After Innocence: Exoneration in America,” a series that aired June 10–13, 2013 on the program The Story for American Public Media.

When The Story ended in 2013, Judge and two colleagues, Lauren Spohrer and Eric Mennel, decided to create their own program. Spohrer came up with the idea for the show while they were brainstorming on Judge's back porch. They released the first episode of Criminal in January 2014. She continued to conduct interviews for and anchor WUNC's program of Here & Now until 2015, when she transitioned into filling in for vacant shifts. The change came with Criminal's increased production schedule to one episode every two weeks.

Judge has been invited for guest interviews on other podcasts including The Murder Squad. She also continued to guest host The State of Things.

During the coronavirus pandemic of 2020, Judge started a limited series podcast called Phoebe Reads a Mystery, in which she reads a chapter of a novel each day. The first was Agatha Christie's first novel The Mysterious Affair at Styles.

== Public image ==
Judge's voice has drawn commentary in the media. Alexis Soloski, theater critic at The New York Times, wrote that "no matter how strange or ghastly the crime, the voice of the host Phoebe Judge somehow remains implacable and oddly soothing." The Star Tribune said, "Judge's sweetly modulated voice serves as a calm foil to the blood-soaked stories." Judge herself has said, "I hope my voice shows reverence, to not only the topic and subject, but also the guest."

== Personal life ==
Judge says that she is "rigid" because she tends to be inflexible about certain habits, such as running 50 miles a month, preferring to eat scheduled meals, and maintaining a regular sleep schedule. She is fond of long walks "for the fun of it," and will sometimes walk for miles, then call someone to pick her up. Each year, she takes a two-week trip to northernmost Maine, where she vacations Internet-free.

Her sister Chloe, 13 months her junior, died in 2015. Judge's namesake aunt, Phoebe Legere, is a singer, painter, and musician who is the maestro of the Lower East Side Children's Chorus of the Theater for the New City. Judge lives with her partner, Sara, in Durham, North Carolina.
