= Griffioen =

Griffioen is a Dutch surname meaning "griffin". The name is thought to derive from a house with the sign of a griffin or a coat of arms, though in the Middle Ages "Griffoen" was also in use as a given name. People with the surname include:

- Annemieke Kiesel (née Griffioen, born 1979), Dutch football midfielder and coach
- James D. Griffioen (born 1977), American writer and photographer
- Jiske Griffioen (born 1985), Dutch wheelchair tennis player
- Sander Griffioen (born 1941), Dutch philosopher

== See also ==
- 128177 Griffioen, a main belt asteroid named after Roger Griffioen (born 1934), physicist
