= WUNW =

WUNW may refer to:

- WUNW (TV), a television station (channel 27) licensed to serve Canton, North Carolina, United States
- WUNW-FM, a radio station (91.1 FM) licensed to serve Welcome, North Carolina
