= WCCT-FM =

- Harwich, Massachusetts; United States
- Frequency: 90.3 MHz

Ownership
- Owner: Cape Cod Regional Technical High School

History
- First air date: September 1989
- Last air date: January 24, 2024 (license cancellation)
- Call sign meaning: Cape Cod Tech

Technical information
- Licensing authority: FCC
- Facility ID: 8574
- ERP: 640 watts
- HAAT: 38 m (125 ft)
- Transmitter coordinates: 41°42′40.3″N 70°4′32″W

Links
- Public license information: Public file; LMS

WCCT-FM was a radio station on 90.3 FM in Harwich, Massachusetts, United States, which operated from 1989 to 2014. It was the radio station of Cape Cod Regional Technical High School and broadcast from a transmitter site on the campus.

Originally a student-run station, it spent most of its history rebroadcasting WBUR-FM of Boston. It ceased airing any local programming in 2011. WBUR replaced WCCT-FM in its network with a new and higher-power station, WBUH, in 2014.

== History ==
On November 18, 1987, Cape Cod Regional Technical High School (Cape Cod Tech) filed with the Federal Communications Commission (FCC) to build a new high school radio station on 90.3 FM in Harwich, Massachusetts. The high school envisioned the station as an educational tool for students in speech and journalism. The FCC granted Cape Cod Tech a construction permit on October 27, 1988, and the station, known as WCCT-FM, began broadcasting in September 1989, debuting in the 1989–90 school year. It was part of the now-defunct hotel and business management shop.

In 1992, it was one of three campus stations on Cape Cod to begin rebroadcasting the programming of WBUR-FM, an NPR station in Boston, under agreement, joining WKKL in Barnstable and WSDH in Sandwich. The idea was hatched by a local resident who noted both the poor signal of WBUR in the area and the underutilization of the WCCT-FM facility. WBUR programming aired during most of the day and around the clock when the school was on summer vacation, with Cape Cod Tech output preempting the Boston public radio outlet from 1 to 2 p.m. on weekdays in 1992 and three hours a day by 1996. As part of the arrangement, WCCT-FM exchanged its original transmitter, dating to 1945, for a new one furnished by WBUR, which also provided other technical support. The school's engineering shop maintained and repaired the equipment, much of which was donated. The station's broadcasts suffered from playing a format that had comparatively little interest to students, with a small and dated record library that included records from the 1960s and 1970s, classical music and old-time radio shows.

Student DJs ceased broadcasting on WCCT-FM in 2011. Three years later, WBUR informed the station that it was terminating the agreement on September 30, 2014. The move came after the station built a new and much more powerful station of its own, WBUH, at 89.1 FM, in nearby Brewster, in May 2014. Cape Cod Regional Tech High School was demolished and rebuilt, but no provision was made for WCCT-FM; as a result, it was silent for more than a year, leading to the cancellation of its license by the FCC on January 24, 2024.
