= WUNC =

WUNC may refer to:

- WUNC (FM), a radio station (91.5 FM) licensed to Chapel Hill, North Carolina, United States
- WUNC-TV, a television station (channel 4 virtual/20 digital) licensed to Chapel Hill, North Carolina
