= List of University of Massachusetts Lowell residence halls =

The University of Massachusetts Lowell housing system is made up of nine residence halls, two apartments, and a hotel/dormitory.

== Residence halls ==
=== East Campus ===
East Campus has the largest number of students living on it. Five of the twelve residence halls are located here.

- Bourgeois Hall - Built in 1967, the building is an upperclassman dormitory-style residence hall.
- Donahue Hall - Built in 1989, the building is a suite-style residence hall.
- Fox Hall - The tallest residence hall at the school, this 18 story tall tower is also the tallest tower in Lowell.
- Leitch Hall - Built in 1967, the building is a dormitory-style freshman honors-only residence hall.
- University Suites - This suite-style residence hall opened in the fall of 2013.
- River Hawk Village - A multi-building apartment complex bought by the university in the summer of 2016. It was converted to student housing for the fall of 2017.

=== North Campus ===
North Campus is an entirely academic campus for UMass Lowell. The residence halls were torn down and replaced with the new Pulichino-Tong Business Building which features classroom space, study space, a four-story atrium overlooking a quad, and a real-time stock simulation lab. North Campus also houses both a nuclear reactor, strictly used for research purposes, and a particle accelerator.

=== South Campus ===
South Campus includes the original residence halls of Lowell State College and new construction. The buildings include:

- Concordia Hall - Built in 1957, it was originally constructed for music students.
- Sheehy Hall - Built in 1989, it is connected to Concordia by a hallway. The residence hall is made up of four, six, and eight-person suites.
- Riverview Suites - This all-suites complex opened in the fall of 2013.

== East Meadow Lane Apartments ==
Prior to the acquisition of River Hawk Village, the University occupied two apartments on East Meadow Lane, built in 1971. This housing complex is separate from the rest of campus and a shuttle or car is needed to travel between the other campuses.

== UMass Lowell Inn & Conference Center ==
Formerly the DoubleTree Hotel, the UMass Lowell Inn & Conference Center was bought in 2009 by the university. The building included a restaurant open to the public, function halls, year-round hotel rooms and residence hall space. It is located in downtown Lowell and used to be the site of many university and community events. It closed in 2023 while being considered for use as a temporary shelter for refugees. It is still closed as discussions continue with the state about its status.

== Former buildings ==
Before the school bought the DoubleTree, the university temporarily housed students during the 2008-2009 academic year in the Radisson Hotel in nearby Nashua, New Hampshire.
