= WUND =

WUND may refer to:

- WUND-FM, a radio station (88.9 FM) licensed to Manteo, North Carolina, United States, an FM transmitter of North Carolina Public Radio
- WUND-TV, a television station (channel 29, virtual 2) licensed to Edenton, North Carolina, United States, a transmitter of UNC-TV
