= Oakland Buddha =

Buddha statue in Oakland, California

Coordinates: 37.7947°N 122.2442°W

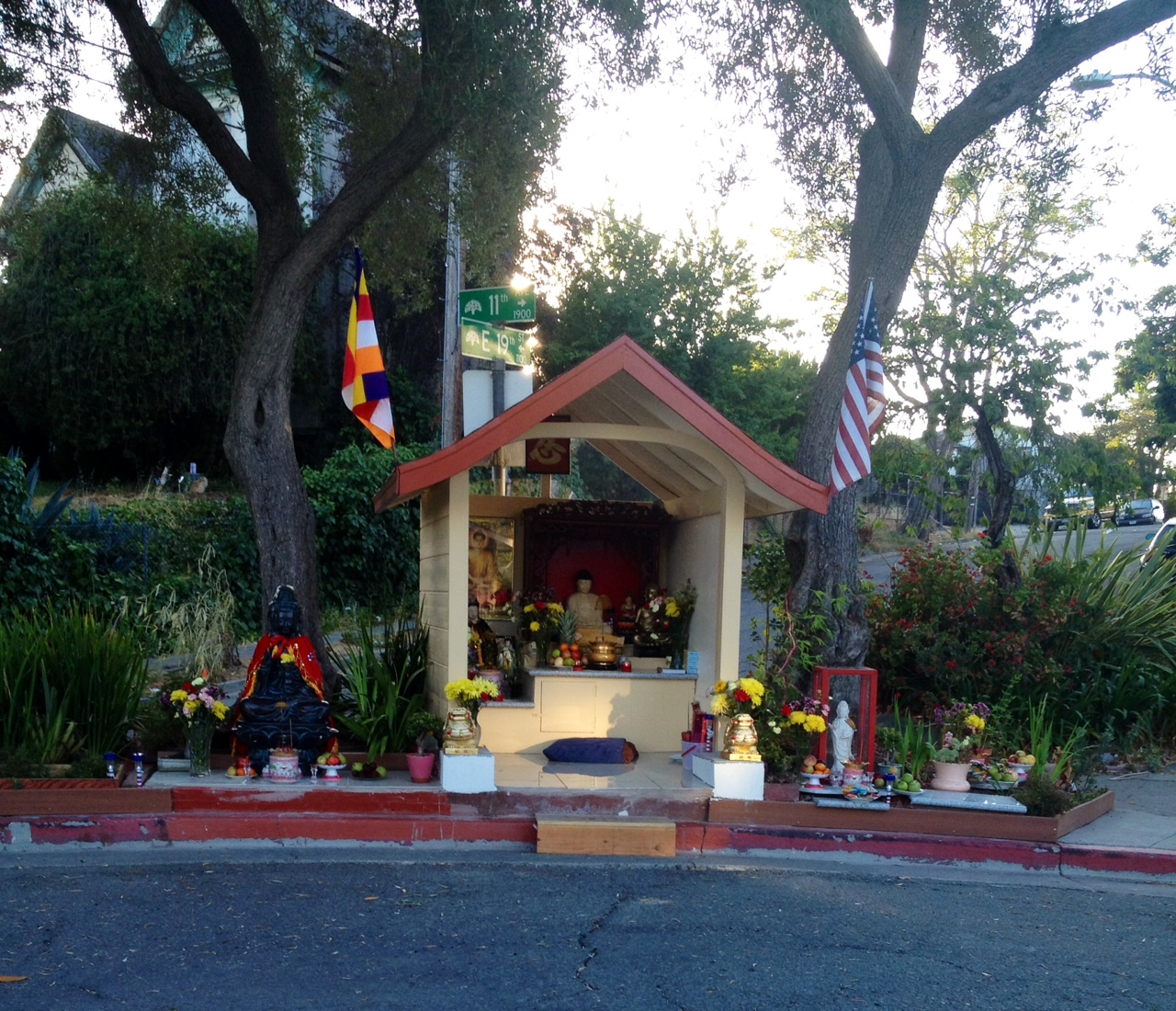
The Oakland Buddha statue and shrine

The Oakland Buddha (Vietnamese: Pháp Duyên Tự) is a statue of a Buddha placed in a traffic median in Oakland, California, in 2009. The statue was placed by neighborhood resident Dan Stevenson who was upset about the frequent use of the median for illegal dumping. Stevenson attached the statue to the median using epoxy and rebar to deter theft of the figure. The city's Public Works Department initially stated that it would remove the statue after receiving a complaint about it, but backed off its plans to do so after receiving substantial opposition. After its installation, local Vietnamese residents made the statue into a Buddhist shrine for daily worship services. Following the installation of the statue and its conversion into a shrine, Oakland police stated that criminal activity in the area, including dumping, graffiti, drug dealing, and prostitution, had dropped by 82% as of 2014.

== Statue installation ==
Stevenson first installed the statue in 2009, after becoming frustrated with large amounts of illegal dumping on a newly constructed traffic median at the intersection of East 19th Street and 11th Avenue in Oakland, California, and the failure of city government to meaningfully correct the problem. While he frequently contacted the city's public works department about the problem, the dumping continued unabated. Though not a Buddhist, Stevenson stated that he believed Buddha to be a neutral and uncontroversial figure who might cause those considering dumping to think twice. During initial installation, Stevenson decided to install the statue with rebar and epoxy to deter theft. An attempt at theft was made shortly after the figure was installed, but the reinforced mounting resulted in the would-be thief being unable to remove the statue.

== Use as Buddhist shrine ==
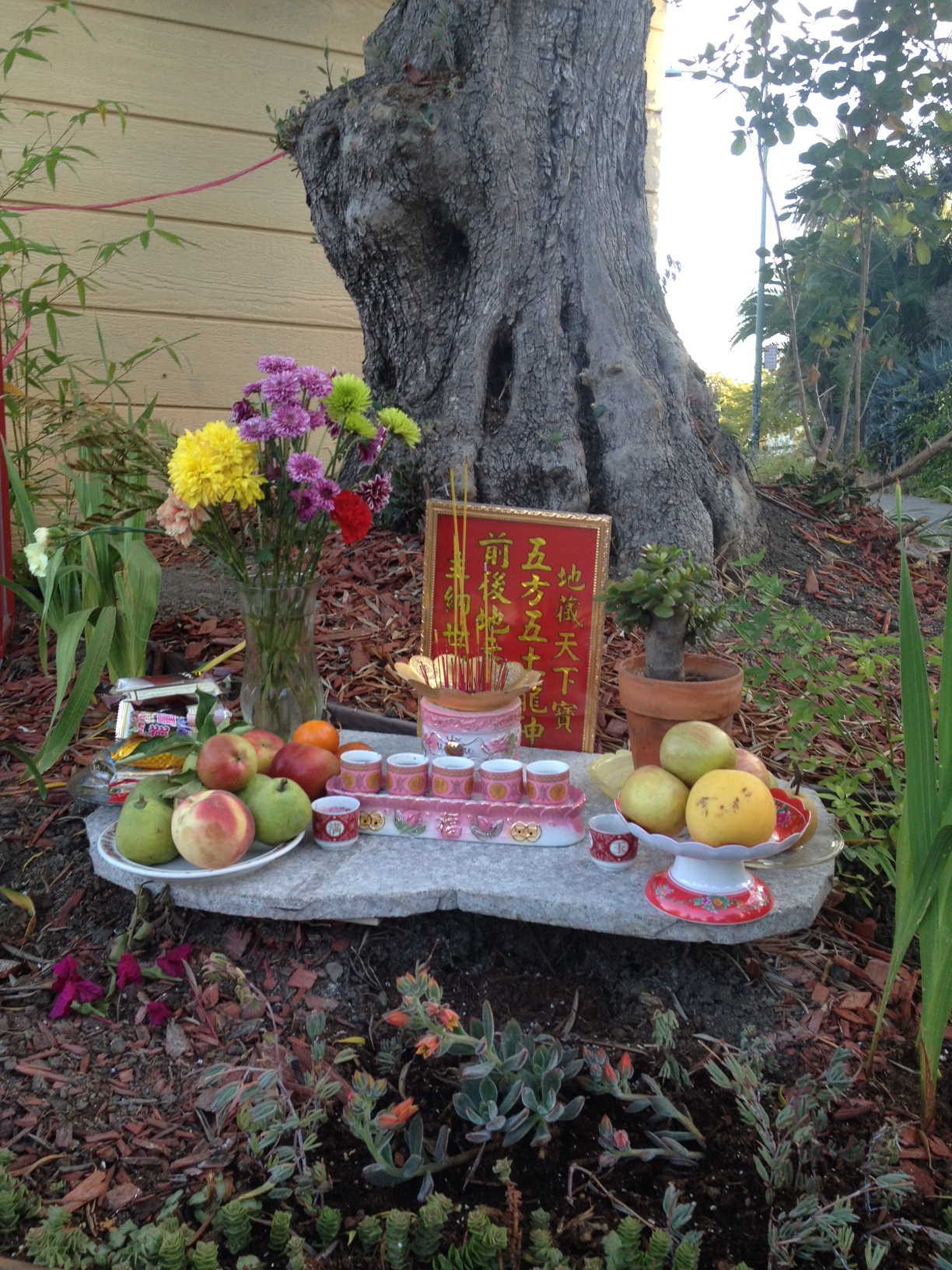
Offerings left at the shrine by worshippers

Approximately four months after installation, Stevenson noticed that the figure had been painted white. In 2010, local Vietnamese residents became aware of the statue, and decided to convert it into a Buddhist shrine. The residents cleaned, repainted, and decorated the statue, built a wooden structure for its protection, and began to leave offerings such as flowers and fresh fruit, as well as to use the statue as a meeting place for worship. A title plaque was added below the roof of the shrine, reading "Pháp Duyên Tự" which roughly translates to "Dharma Temple". An additional statue of the Buddhist icon of compassion Guanyin was installed by worshippers, and the shrine is now used as a daily meeting space for prayers.

== Removal attempt by city ==
In 2012, the Oakland Public Works Department stated that it had received complaints about the presence of the Buddha and shrine, and would remove it from the median. City officials stated that it represented a "safety issue" as it was located in a road median and that some neighbors were unhappy with early morning noise from worshippers. After receiving substantial opposition from neighborhood residents and worshippers who use the shrine, the city announced that it would "table" the issue, and as of 2021 has not made further attempts at removing either the statue or shrine.

== Effects ==
The Oakland Buddha has been featured on episodes of the Criminal and 99% Invisible podcasts. During the second time featured on Criminal, the show producer noted that the episode was one of the most popular that the series had made. The Oakland Police Department stated that since the statue was made into a shrine and daily worship began in 2012, crime had fallen in the neighborhood by 82% by 2014, though Oakland PD noted that they could not definitively state that the shrine is the cause. Stevenson stated that he receives visits both from worshippers at the shrine, who sometimes offer him gifts, and by tourists curious about it.
