= WCCT =

WCCT may refer to:

- WCCT-TV, a television station (channel 33, virtual 20) licensed to serve Waterbury, Connecticut, United States
- WCCT-FM, a defunct radio station (90.3 FM) formerly licensed to serve Harwich, Massachusetts, United States
- WACH, a television station (channel 48/PSIP 57) licensed to serve Columbia, South Carolina, United States, which held the call sign WCCT-TV from 1985 until 1988
