= The Connection (radio program) =

Public radio call-in program

- Country of origin: USA
- Languages: English, Korean
- Home station: WBUR
- Hosted by: Christopher Lydon (1994-2001); Dick Gordon (2001-2005)
- Original release: 1994 – 5 August 2005
- Opening theme: "Cantaloop (Flip Fantasia)" by Us3

The Connection was a public radio call-in program from WBUR that ran from 1994 to 2005. Originally hosted by Christopher Lydon (1994–2001), and (after a series of short-term fill-in hosts) followed by Canadian Dick Gordon (2001–2005), it was syndicated to as many as 66 public radio stations in the United States.

In March 2001, Lydon was dismissed after negotiations for renewal of his contract broke down. Lydon now hosts WBUR's Open Source.

Dick Gordon became the show's host just after the September 11, 2001 attacks. He eventually took the program to Baghdad for 10 days in April 2003.

The Connection was abruptly canceled after the August 5, 2005 broadcast, and Gordon was laid off. Gordon said that the circumstances surrounding his termination were not explained well, though it was believed that WBUR was presumably not able to continue carrying the show.

WBUR filled The Connection's 10 a.m. to noon timeslot with On Point, a similar program previously aired in the 7-9 p.m. timeslot. Gordon now hosts The Story with Dick Gordon at North Carolina Public Radio.

The Connection's theme song was the jazz tune "Cantaloupe Island" by Herbie Hancock, performed by Us3 in their rendition titled "Cantaloop (Flip Fantasia)".
