= Tom Ashbrook =

American journalist (born 1956)

- Born: 1956 (age 69–70); Bloomington, Illinois, U.S.
- Education: Yale University
- Occupation: Radio host
- Employer: NPR (2001–2018)
- Spouses: Danielle Guichard (m. 1975; died 2014) Cathryn Ann Clüver (m. 2017)
- Children: 3

Thomas E. Ashbrook is an American journalist and radio broadcaster. He was formerly the host of the nationally syndicated, public radio call-in program On Point, from which he was dismissed after an investigation concluded he had created a hostile work environment. Prior to working with On Point, he was a foreign correspondent in Asia, and foreign editor of The Boston Globe. He currently hosts a podcast, Tom Ashbrook—Conversations .

== Early life and education ==
Born in 1956 on a farm in Bloomington, Illinois, he studied American history at Yale University and Gandhi's independence movement at Andhra University in India.

== Early career ==
Ashbrook worked in Alaska as a surveyor and dynamiter of oil fields to help pay for college. After leaving for Asia, he produced English-dubbed kung fu films in Hong Kong where he spent a decade as a foreign correspondent in India, Hong Kong, and Tokyo. His first newspaper job was at the South China Morning Post. During the late 1980s Ashbrook became foreign editor for The Boston Globe.

As a correspondent Ashbrook covered the "refugee exodus from Vietnam and the post-Mao opening of China, and has covered turmoil and shifting cultural and economic trends in the United States and around the world, from Somalia and Rwanda to Russia and the Balkans."

Ashbrook was a Nieman Fellow at Harvard University during which time he decided to leave the Globe in 1996 and create an Internet startup with college friend Rolly Rouse. This company eventually became homeportfolio.com. Ashbrook wrote a book called The Leap: A Memoir of Love and Madness in the Internet Gold Rush about his experience in Internet entrepreneurship.

== On Point; dismissal ==
Ashbrook joined public radio following the September 11, 2001 attacks, when he was enlisted by NPR and WBUR-Boston for special coverage. He hosted the National Public Radio show On Point. Ashbrook oversaw a staff of 10 who assisted with research and show preparation – typically compiling information relating to the topics to be discussed on the following day's program for Ashbrook to take and read.

In December 2017, Ashbrook was placed on leave because of unspecified accusations of misconduct. His final broadcast was on December 8, 2017. WBUR later reported 11 men and women came forward detailing alleged behavior including tirades, belittling critiques of show ideas, and name calling during meetings. Ashbrook allegedly would then give neck or back rubs, hugs, and "creepy" sex talks after criticism or critical comment. Boston University hired two law firms to investigate allegations against Ashbrook. One examined allegations of unwanted contact and the other looked into bullying behavior. On February 14, 2018, Ashbrook was dismissed from WBUR after both investigations concluded he had created a hostile work environment, although neither investigation concluded the harassment was sexual in nature. Ashbrook made a statement on the same day, saying that the decision was “profoundly unfair.” In subsequent news interviews, he described himself as "chastened" but determined to return to radio broadcasting "somewhere, sometime soon."

== Subsequent work: Tom Ashbrook Conversations, Swing State and Ashbrook Live ==
In June 2018, Ashbrook started recording shows of his own podcast, "Tom Ashbrook-Conversations". He launched the podcast via Twitter on August 1, 2018. The conversations cover issues of global importance such as racism, social media, and the global balance of power. Featured guests on the show so far have included Steve Locke, Kori Schake, Salman Habib, Maya Jasanoff, and Sir John Sawers. Thirteen episodes were produced, the last posted October, 2018.

In collaboration with writer Heidi Legg, Ashbrook co-hosted the podcast "Swing State", a show focusing on political and cultural divides in the United States as well as issues and trends transforming the country in the run-up to the 2020 Presidential election. The 27-episode series debuted on March 24, 2020, and ended just before the election. Guests on the show included Bill McKibben, Heather Cox Richardson, Robert Reich, plus a variety of writers, academics, politicians and others.

Since September 2020, Ashbrook has produced a Facebook stream, "Ashbrook Live", a series of interviews with cultural, political and academic figures such as Thomas Ricks, David Sanger, Jewel and Yvette Simpson. The recorded interviews are also available on his YouTube channel.

== Personal life ==
Tom Ashbrook has a daughter and two sons. On November 6, 2014, his wife of 39 years, Danielle Guichard-Ashbrook, died of cancer. Ashbrook subsequently married Cathryn Ann Clüver in June 2017, after meeting in March 2016 regarding an On Point story concerning refugees. He lives in Newton, Massachusetts.

Ashbrook underwent heart bypass surgery in November 2007 and was off air until January 2, 2008, when he discussed his medical journey in a show featuring his doctors and nurses.

== Awards ==
- 1996 Livingston Award for National Reporting
