= Cathryn Clüver Ashbrook =

German-American political scientist

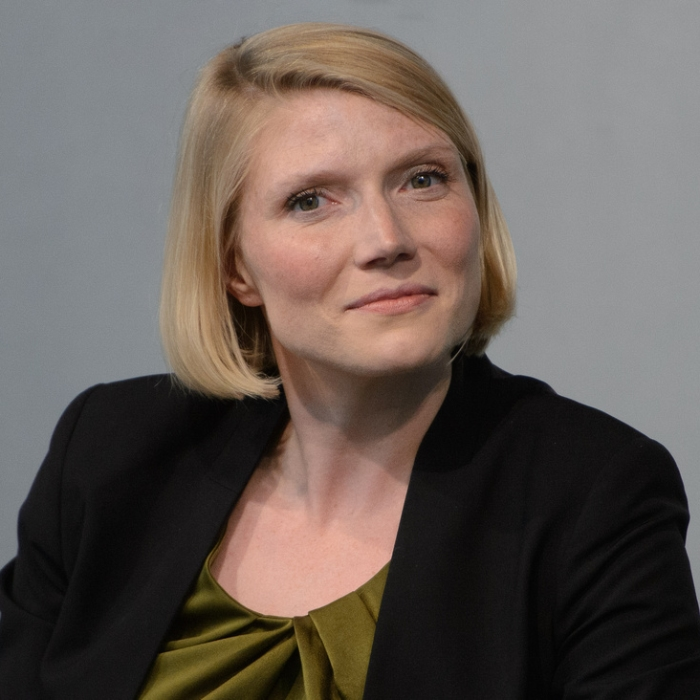
- Born: 1976 (age 49–50)
- Education: Brown University; London School of Economics; Harvard Kennedy School
- Organization: Bertelsmann Stiftung
- Spouse: Tom Ashbrook (m. 2017)

Cathryn Clüver Ashbrook (born 1976) is a German-American political scientist. She was the director and CEO of the German Council on Foreign Relations from June 2021 to February 2022. Since August 2022 she has served as an Executive Vice President of the Bertelsmann Stiftung.

== Biography ==
Clüver Ashbrook grew up as the child of an American mother and a German-American father in Berlin and Wiesbaden. After graduating from Gutenbergschule Wiesbaden, she studied at Brown University, Rhode Island, USA and in Strasbourg, France. This was followed by a master's degree at the London School of Economics. From 2008 to 2010 she pursued a Master of Public Administration at the Harvard Kennedy School, Cambridge, Massachusetts.

She has been working there as a researcher since 2011, among others as co-founder and executive director of the Future of Diplomacy project, at Harvard University’s Belfer Center for Science and International Affairs. She has been the leader of a research program on Europe and transatlantic relations since 2018.

She has also worked as a television journalist for CNN in Atlanta and London, at the strategy consultancy Roland Berger in France and China, and served on the Management Board of the Brussels-based think tank European Policy Centre (EPC).

She married the American journalist Tom Ashbrook in 2017.
