= WUML =

- Lowell, Massachusetts; United States
- Broadcast area: Merrimack Valley
- Frequency: 91.5 MHz
- Branding: 91.5 WUML

Programming
- Format: College radio

Ownership
- Owner: University of Massachusetts Lowell

History
- First air date: November 26, 1967
- Former call signs: WLTI (1967–1976); WJUL (1976–2003)
- Call sign meaning: University of Massachusetts Lowell

Technical information
- Licensing authority: FCC
- Facility ID: 69410
- Class: A
- ERP: 1,400 watts
- HAAT: 63 meters (207 ft)
- Transmitter coordinates: 42°39′7.3″N 71°19′13.2″W

Links
- Public license information: Public file; LMS
- Webcast: Listen live
- Website: www.wuml.org

WUML (91.5 FM) is a non-commercial college radio station licensed to Lowell, Massachusetts, United States. The station is owned by the University of Massachusetts Lowell. The transmitter is atop Fox Hall on Pawtucket Street in Lowell.

== History ==
WUML was started in 1952 by Ed Bonacci, a student attending what was then called the Lowell Technological Institute. After accidentally building a transmitter in his dorm room, a studio was built in Kitson Hall, with a 5-10 watt transmitter located in the basement of the old library. At exactly 7:00 pm on January 15, 1953, the newly christened WLTI began broadcasting on carrier current over electrical power wires specifically to Eames and Smith Hall, as well as Alumni Library on the University's North Campus.

During the summer of 1953, permanent station consoles were built and readied for the moving of the studio from Kitson Hall to the basement of Eames Hall, which at that time was being used as a trunk room.

On November 26, 1967, WLTI became a Federal Communications Commission (FCC)-licensed and regulated educational FM station broadcasting on air at its current frequency of 91.5 FM, using 10-watt transmitter and antenna capable of reaching Cumnock, Southwick, Leitch, and Bourgeois Halls.

Construction on new facilities in the basement of Lydon Library began in 1969 and were completed in 1971, before being renovated in 2005. Currently located in Lydon, the station contains two studios (one responsible for broadcasting) as well as the Fallout Shelter, a live studio for acts to perform on air. Credited to Chris Porter and Bob Weston, the creation of the Fallout Shelter brought acts such as Pixies, Frank Zappa, Cheech & Chong, Jorge Santana, and Jethro Tull as well as many others through the years, and it continues to operate during Live from the Fallout Shelter on Monday nights.

WLTI changed its call sign to WJUL on November 1, 1976, after the Lowell Technological Institute merged with Lowell State College in 1975 to form the University of Lowell. The station changed its call sign once again on October 15, 2003, to its current WUML in order to display the UML title the school received after joining the University of Massachusetts system in 1991.

In the mid-2000s, a morning show, Lowell Sunrise, was added to the schedule. It was produced by paid professional staff and managed by the university itself, rather than the undergraduate student organization. The show itself was meant to have a format somewhere between that of National Public Radio and AM commercial morning drive-time talk shows. However, following the failure of talent brought in from The Sun, which worked on the show to try and generate interest from local listeners, the university administration took over programming of Lowell Sunrise. Soon afterwards, the broadcast window was cut even further due to personnel/budgeting constraints, and UMass Lowell cancelled the show altogether, returning all broadcast hours, budget dollars and station management to the students.

A secondary plan to boost community interest was launched by the university in May 2005. Professional radio host Christopher Lydon was hired to create a new show called Open Source to air on WUML and be syndicated to some 700 radio stations through Public Radio International. Once again, there was no student input on the addition of Lydon or the new programming. Failure of the show to capture an audience with the proper size and demographics necessary for it to be considered successful resulted in control once again being handed back to the students.

== Programming ==
WUML aims to showcase underground artists of all genres and to provide a voice for the Lowell community. The broadcast week includes programming produced by UMass Lowell students and by community hosts who represent the ethnically and linguistically diverse community of Lowell; among the languages that can be heard are Hindi, Khmer, Spanish, Portuguese, Laotian, and French.

Student programming is broadcast during the week and includes musical genres such as rock, folk, jazz, Latin, electronic, blues, and metal. Community programming is broadcast on the weekends. The station also broadcasts the Morning Drive-By, a variety music and news show aimed towards commuters, and Thinking Out Loud, a daytime show focusing on current local and world issues.

The members of WUML produce new shows every semester; some of the longer-running shows include Gunjan Radio (on-air since 1983), the Stress Factor, Live from the Fallout Shelter, and Blues Deluxe. WUML programming is also available online via streaming audio through links provided on its website. The streaming audio is available at various bit rates (for slow and high speed connections) in MP3 and Ogg formats.

WUML is involved in UMass Lowell athletics; the station features live broadcasts of the UMass Lowell River Hawks men's ice hockey games, including Hockey East championship games at TD Garden in Boston, as well as shows dedicated to the discussion of current campus sports.

The station also hosts Rock for Tots, a live music event designed to raise money for local charities. Past headliners include Sidney Gish, Horse Jumper of Love, The World Is a Beautiful Place & I Am No Longer Afraid to Die, A Great Big Pile of Leaves, A Wilhelm Scream, Titus Andronicus, Apollo Sunshine, and Ted Leo.

== See also ==
- Campus radio
- List of college radio stations in the United States
