= Christopher Lydon =

American media personality (born 1940)

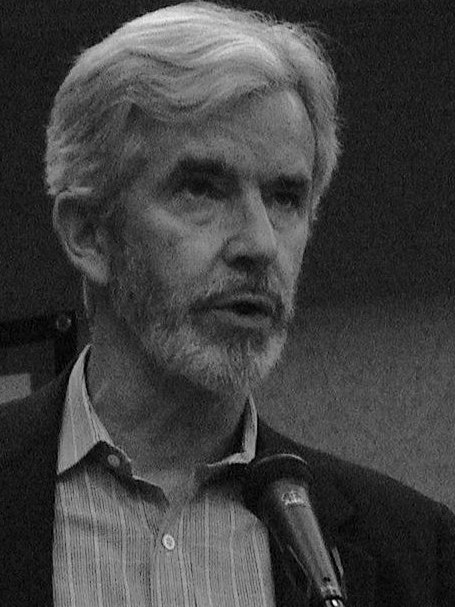
- Christopher Lydon
- Born: 1940 (age 84–85); Boston, Massachusetts, U.S.
- Education: Roxbury Latin School
- Alma mater: Yale University
- Occupation(s): journalist, author, broadcaster

Christopher Lydon (born 1940 in Boston, Massachusetts) is an American media personality and author. He was the original host of The Connection, produced by WBUR and syndicated to other NPR stations, and created Open Source, a weekly radio program on WBUR.

== Education ==
Lydon is a graduate of Boston's Roxbury Latin School and Yale University.

== Journalistic history ==
Lydon is a former journalist with The New York Times, and anchored The Ten-O'Clock News on WGBH in Boston, Massachusetts. After WGBH cancelled its nightly news program, he moved to WBUR, where in 1994 he became host of The Connection. In 2001, he and his longtime producer Mary McGrath were fired after a high-profile contract dispute with WBUR. McGrath's and Lydon's claim, rejected by the station, was that they, not WBUR, were the true creators of The Connection - moving it far beyond the initial WBUR template to become the successful, widely syndicated program.

During his tenure on The Connection, Lydon frequently discussed Internet topics, and his Radio Open Source blog became a launchpad for international broadcasts and other activities. While a fellow at Harvard Law School's Berkman Center for Internet & Society in 2003, Lydon began recording in-depth interviews focused on blogging and politics, posting the downloadable audio files as part of his blog. Dave Winer, also a Berkman Fellow, created an RSS enclosure feed for Lydon's MP3 interview files, an event credited with sparking the growth of podcasting.

Lydon is credited with creating the first podcast ever recorded in July 2003.

He also launched the political site Bopnews (for "Blogging of the President") during the 2004 U.S. presidential campaign.

On May 30, 2005, Lydon returned to the air on University of Massachusetts Lowell's radio station WUML and Boston's WGBH with a new show called Open Source, syndicated through Public Radio International. Including a blog and podcast, the program promised to "use blogs to be a show about the world." On October 16, 2006, the Lowell, Massachusetts newspaper The Sun announced that "Radio personality Christopher Lydon's lucrative and controversial contract with UMass Lowell to broadcast an hourlong radio show will not be renewed when it expires in December." Upon notice of the UMass Lowell discontinuance, Lydon began actively seeking new funders for the program. In November 2007, Lydon partnered with Brown University's Watson Institute for International Studies to continue producing Radio Open Source.

In 2013, Lydon was often a guest commentator on Thursdays on WGBH Radio's "Boston Public Radio" show. In 2014, Lydon returned to WBUR with a weekly radio program, Open Source.

== Politics ==
Lydon was a candidate for mayor of Boston in 1993. He finished sixth out of eight candidates in the nonpartisan primary.
