= Open Source (radio show) =

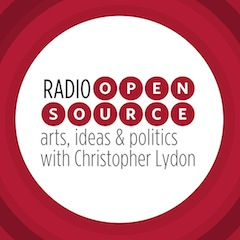
- Genre: News: Arts, literature, foreign affairs
- Running time: 60 minutes
- Country of origin: United States
- Language: English
- Home station: WBUR
- Syndicates: PRX
- Hosted by: Christopher Lydon
- Created by: Christopher Lydon; Mary McGrath
- Produced by: Mary McGrath; Conor Gillies
- Executive producer: Mary McGrath
- Original release: 2005 – Present
- Website: radioopensource.org
- Podcast: www.radioopensource.org/feed/

Open Source is an American public radio show hosted by Christopher Lydon, former New York Times journalist and original host of The Connection and aired since 2005. The show focuses on the arts, literature, and foreign affairs.

== History ==
In May 2005, Christopher Lydon and his longtime producer Mary McGrath partnered with University of Massachusetts Lowell's radio station WUML, WGBH (FM), and Public Radio International to produce Open Source as a daily call-in radio program. The show was syndicated by 32 NPR stations, before it was canceled on October 16, 2006. In 2007, Lydon moved to Brown University's Watson Institute for International Studies to podcast hourlong conversations under the name Open Source. In 2013, Lydon and McGrath returned to WBUR to produce Open Source as a weekly show. In 2014, Conor Gillies joined the team as audio producer.

== Schedule ==
Open Source airs twice a week on WBUR, Thursday at 9pm and Sunday at 2pm. The Open Source podcast reaches listeners in over 150 countries each week. Open Source also produces ongoing series on its website, including "Reading Chekhov," a reading of Anton Chekhov's short stories by Boston actors and academics, and "Parachute Radio," international conversations from Ghana, India, Pakistan, Egypt, Jamaica, Singapore and Cuba. Open Source is the world's oldest active podcast.

== Notable guests ==
Previous guests in longform conversations have included Philip Roth, Noam Chomsky, Jonathan Lethem, Orhan Pamuk, Cornel West, Harold Bloom, Matt Taibbi, Ha Jin, Paul Krugman, Gordon Wood, Joan Didion, Tim Berners-Lee, Gore Vidal, Megan Marshall, V. S. Naipaul, David Bromwich, John Mearsheimer, Edwidge Danticat, Jeffrey Sachs, Ralph Nader, Elizabeth Warren, Amartya Sen, Norman Mailer, David Foster Wallace and Edward Said.
