= Tony Cennamo =

Tony Cennamo (September 30, 1933 – June 8, 2010) was for 25 years a jazz disc jockey on Boston University's WBUR. When he had a morning show in the 1970s and 1980s he began his show with Oliver Nelson's Stolen Moments or "Blues In A Minute" by the Thad Jones / Mel Lewis Orchestra.

Cennamo was born in Brooklyn, New York, the firstborn to Louis Cennamo and Marie (Esposito) Cennamo. Cennamo started his commercial radio career as producer of a talk radio show at WCBS. He was also the program director at the old WCAS (AM). In the early 1960s Tony worked as a disc Jockey at KOIL-FM in Omaha, Nebraska. On weekends he headed up a popular Omaha jazz quartet known as 'Tony Cennamo and the Jazz-All-Stars.' In 1972 the City of Somerville MA hired Tony to renegotiate the city's cable TV license with Warner Cable TV. His groundbreaking public advocacy work led to the creation of one of the first community-run cable TV channels in the nation. In 1986 he represented the city of Boston in an exchange program with Melbourne, Australia to lecture about jazz history and appear on radio programs (Emerson Beacon, Winter 1989). A tribute was given to him at Berklee Performance Center in September 1997 to honor his quarter century at WBUR. Sissy Smith, James Williams, Tony Zano, Phil Wilson, and Rebecca Parris were the headliners at this event. (Boston Herald, Thursday, September 25, 1997. Arts and Lifestyles.) In 1977 Cennamo received the Boston Jazz Society's Man of the Year. He also taught Jazz History at Emerson College.

In 1986 Cennamo suffered a stroke. After an absence of a few months he was back on the air (WBUR) for another eleven years, with his son James producing and engineering. Tony helped a lot of Boston Jazz musicians, always ready to offer them support and airplay.

Cennamo died on June 8, 2010, at the Glen Ridge Nursing Care Center in Malden, Massachusetts.

== See also ==
- WBUR
