= Meghna Chakrabarti =

American journalist and radio producer

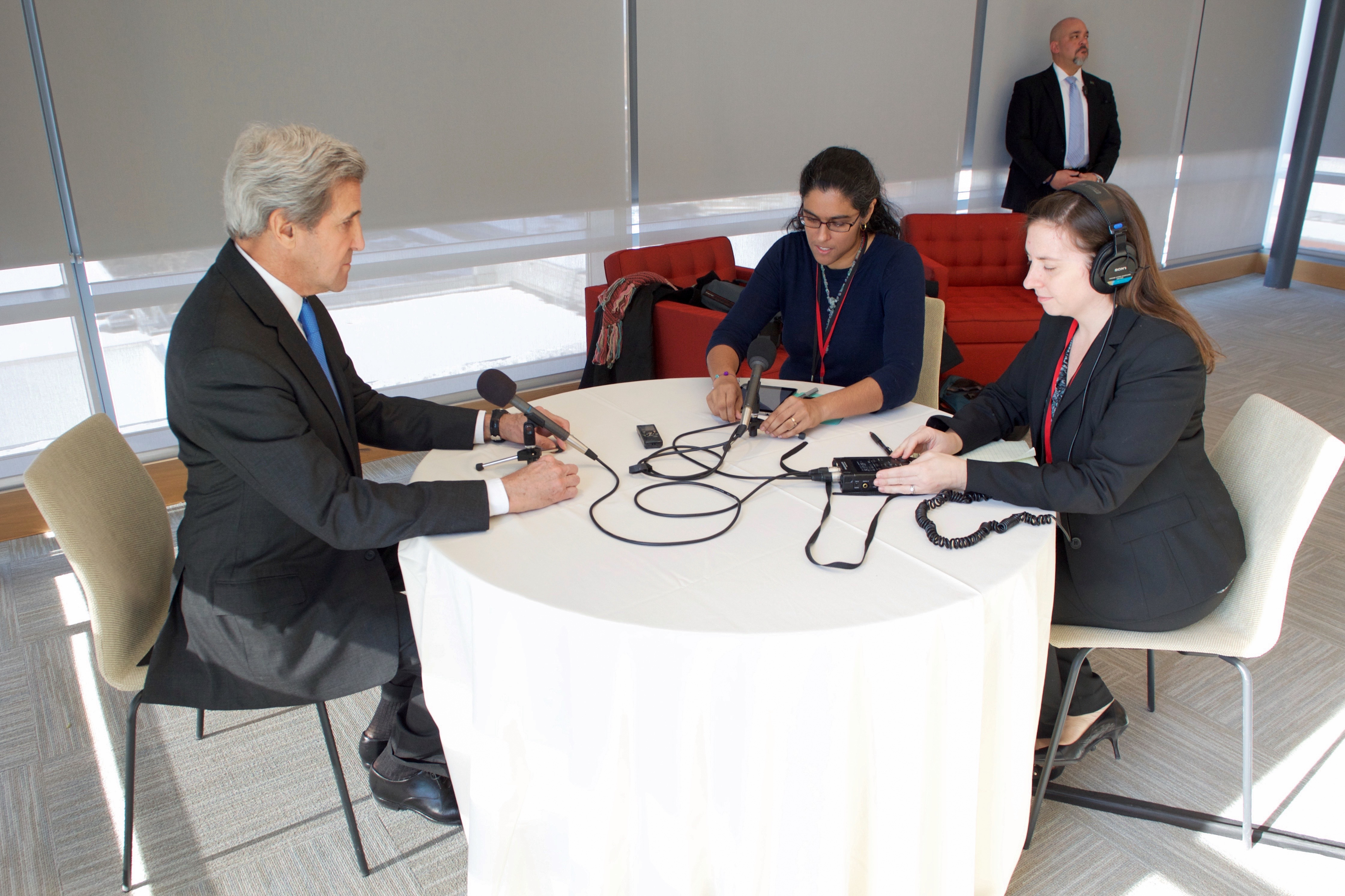
- Chakrabarti (center) interviewing John Kerry in 2017
- Born: Boston, Massachusetts
- Education: Oregon State University (BS); Harvard University (MS); Boston University (MBA)
- Presenting career
- Show: On Point
- Network: WBUR
- Country: United States

Meghna Chakrabarti is an American journalist and radio producer. She is the host of American Public Media's On Point. She was the long-time host for the Modern Love podcast (a collaboration between WBUR and The New York Times). She formerly hosted the WBUR local news program Radio Boston and was the primary fill-in host for Here & Now, produced by WBUR and distributed nationally by NPR. She previously also reported on New England transportation and energy issues for WBUR’s news department.

== Background ==
Chakrabarti has a Bachelor of Science in Civil and Environmental Engineering from Oregon State University (1998), a Master of Science in Environmental Science and Risk Management from Harvard University (2001), and a Master of Business Administration - Finance Concentration (with an emphasis in Leadership and Organizational Change) from Boston University (2013).

== Awards ==
In 2021, On Point won a National Edward R. Murrow Award for Best News Documentary for the episode "What the President Knew."

In 2022, she won the Gracie Award for Best News Documentary from the Alliance for Women in Media for On Point's episode "A Look Back at 1992 Los Angeles and America Since Rodney King". The same episode won a regional Edward R. Murrow award.

In 2023, On Point's "Smarter Health" won a first-place award from the Association of Health Care Journalists. The same year she won two additional Gracie awards, one for Best National Radio Investigative Feature for "An 'invisible epidemic': Survivors of domestic violence on living with traumatic brain injury" as well as Best National Public Affairs show for "Behind the decades-long fight to close the 'boyfriend loophole."

She has also received awards in reporting from the Associated Press and the Radio Television News Directors Association, and her WBUR team shared the 2016 award for General Excellence in Radio/Audio from the Asian American Journalists Association.

== Personal life ==
Chakrabarti was born in Boston to Mumbaikar immigrant parents. As a child, her family moved to Oregon where she was raised. She currently lives in Boston. She is married and has two children.
