= Cape Cod Regional Technical High School =

Public school in Harwich, Massachusetts, US

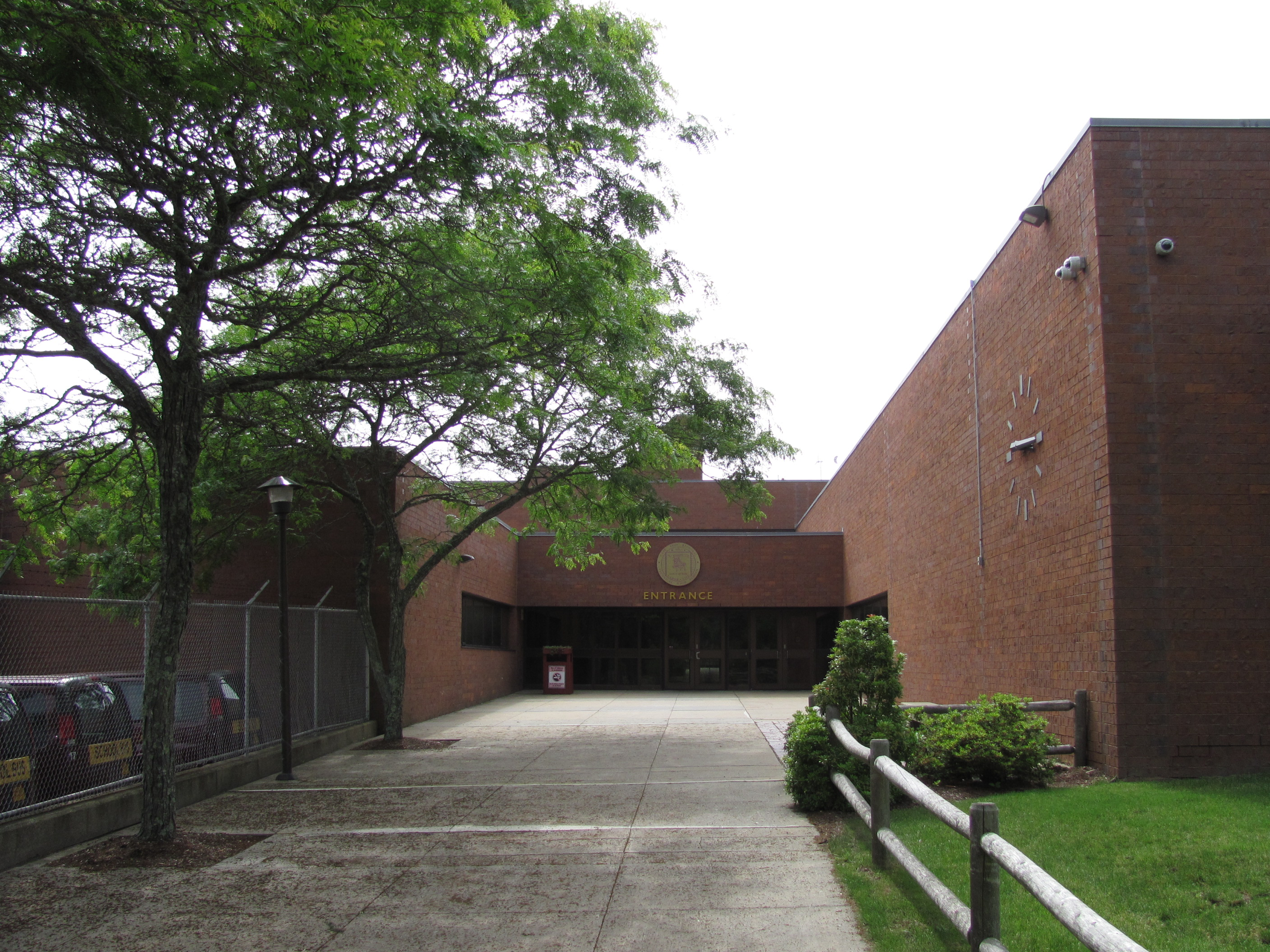
- Main Entrance

Location
- 351 Pleasant Lake Avenue; Harwich, Massachusetts 02645; United States; 41°42′38″N 70°04′32″W

Information
- Type: Public vocational/technical
- Motto: Preparing Students for Careers, College, and Beyond!
- Established: 1975
- School district: Cape Cod Regional School District
- Superintendent: Robert P. Sanborn III
- Principal: William Terranova
- Teaching staff: 64.36 (FTE)
- Grades: 9-12
- Student to teacher ratio: 10.30
- Athletics conference: MIAA District D – Mayflower Athletic Conference
- Mascot: Maroon and gray (Changed from maroon and gold in 2020)
- Team name: Crusaders
- Rival: Upper Cape Tech, Monomoy
- Newspaper: Tech Talk
- Budget: $15,381,904 total $24,548 per pupil (2016)
- Communities served: Mashpee, Barnstable, Yarmouth, Dennis, Harwich, Chatham, Brewster, Orleans, Eastham, Wellfleet, Truro, Provincetown
- Website: www.capetech.us

Cape Cod Regional Technical High School, also known as Cape Tech, Cape Cod Tech, Lower Cape Tech, and sometimes abbreviated as CCT, is a public vocational and technical high school located in Harwich, Massachusetts, United States.

Cape Cod Regional Technical High School was founded in 1975. The school accepts students from the towns of Mashpee, Barnstable, Yarmouth, Harwich, Dennis, Chatham, Brewster, Orleans, Eastham, Wellfleet, Truro and Provincetown. Cape Cod Tech is located just off Route 6 in Harwich at Exit 82.

The school has an approximate enrollment of 650+ students in grades 9–12. The previous school building has been closed and demolished to make way for a new building, which was scheduled to be opened after the 2019–2020 school year, but partially closed due to the COVID-19 Pandemic.

== Sports ==
Cape Cod Tech is part of the Massachusetts Interscholastic Athletic Association and fields many varsity sports. The school's team name is Crusaders and the school's colors are maroon and gold. Cape Tech offers many sports programs. They are football, golf, cheerleading, cross-country, volleyball, boys' soccer, girls' soccer, boys' ice hockey, girls' ice hockey, boys' basketball, girls' basketball, baseball, softball, lacrosse, track and field, and tennis. Cape Cod Tech's ice hockey team began a co-op program with Cape Cod Academy in the 2009–2010 season.

Cape Cod Tech experienced much success in the early 2000s in football. Under coach David Currid, the football team has participated in Eastern Massachusetts Championship games in 2000 and in 2006. In 2000, they lost to Georgetown. In 2006, the team went 9–1 in the regular season, with the lone loss coming at the hands of Mashpee, 12–0. They then defeated West Roxbury 35–27 in the first round of the playoffs to earn a berth in the Division 3A Super Bowl, where they lost a 7-0 heartbreaker to Ipswich. Year in and year out, the football team competed for the Mayflower Large League title.

In 2010, the MIAA voted to end the cooperative football program between Harwich High School and Cape Cod Tech, because Cape Cod Tech has enough players to run a football program on its own. Since 2011, the Cape Cod Tech will always play Upper Cape Cod Regional Technical High School on the annual Thanksgiving Day game.

In the 2013–2014 boys' hockey season, Cape Cod Tech had much success. Finishing with a record of (15–4–1) .775, Cape Cod Tech/Cape Cod Academy were the number 1 seed in the MIAA South Division 3 Tournament. Although they suffered a loss to Abbington, the Crusaders held their heads up high on their season's accomplishment.

The athletic facilities at Cape Cod Tech have not been host to just the school's own activities. In 1988, the Brewster Whitecaps, of the Cape Cod Baseball League, were founded. From their inception in 1988 until 2005, the Whitecaps played their home games on the grounds of this school. Cape Cod Tech, in conjunction with the Whitecaps, hosted the CCBL All Star Game in 2000. Brewster also managed to win the League Championship that season.

In the 2018-19 boys' soccer season, Cape Cod Tech had much success during a season of change, after moving to the Mayflower Small League of the Mayflower Athletic Conference, District D- MIAA, earlier during the 2017–18 season. With a record of (12-7-2), they gave CCT the best soccer season since the championship run of 2000–2003, and the best season with coach Ivan Popov. They won the Mayflower League when they beat Sacred Heart in the first round 3–2, and then beat Nantucket in a quarter final match 2–1. They ended their season with a loss against Atlantis Charter 5–1, but still managed to provide an impressive record for their first Mayflower playoff run, with a record of (9-0-1). Coach Ivan Popov was then named the Mayflower League Coach of the Year, and player Rick Goncalves was named Player of the Year.

=== Current sports offered ===
These sports are currently offered at Cape Cod Regional Technical High School as of January 2020. A majority of the sports offered to students at CCT are for both boys and girls, as required by Title IX of the Education Amendments of 1972.

- Football
- Volleyball
- Lacrosse
- Tennis
- Track and field
- Softball
- Ice hockey
- Soccer
- Basketball
- Cross-country
- Cheerleading
- Golf
- Wrestling

=== Former sports offered ===
- Rowing
- Lacrosse (Girls)

== Vocational shop programs ==
=== Current vocational shops ===
Cape Cod Tech currently offers 15 shop programs to students, which are as follows:

- Auto Collision Technology
- Automotive Technology
- Carpentry
- Cosmetology
- Culinary Arts
- Dental Assisting
- Electrical
- Engineering
- Design and Visual Communication
- Health Technology
- Horticulture
- Heating, Ventilation & Air Conditioning
- Information Technology
- Marine Services Technology
- Plumbing

=== Former shops ===
- Hotel, Restaurant, and Business Management, replaced by Engineering.
- Distributive Education
- Painting and Decorating
- Masonry
- Fashion
- Early Childhood Education
- Metal Fabrication & Welding
- Commercial Fishing
- Banking
- Welding

== Technical competitions ==
Each year, students at Cape Cod Tech have the opportunity to participate in various technical competitions. For example, students in the Horticulture program have the opportunity to participate in Future Farmers of America competitions, and students in the hotel, Restaurant, and Business Management program may participate in DECA. Students enrolled in all other CCT technical programs may participate in SkillsUSA which hosts district, state, and national competitions between technical schools for students to show what they have learned. Carol Olsen, a Graphic Arts instructor, organizes Cape Cod Tech's involvement in SkillsUSA.

== Renewable energy ==
Cape Cod Tech offers a recycling program called the "Green Beings", which was started in 2005. The school is also home to a Renewable Energy Center (REC). Construction on the REC building was completed in the spring of 2009, and the grand opening for the facility took place in October 2009.

== Radio station ==
Cape Cod Tech held the license for a radio station, WCCT-FM 90.3, which broadcast actively from 1989 to 2014. It primarily rebroadcast WBUR-FM in Boston, though it did produce student-run programming for most of its history. The Federal Communications Commission cancelled WCCT-FM's license effective January 24, 2024.

== See also ==
- National FFA Organization
