= The Ten O'Clock News (1976 TV program) =

- Presented by: Christopher Lydon
- Country of origin: United States

Original release
- Network: WGBH
- Release: January 15, 1976 – May 30, 1991

The Ten O'Clock News was a weeknight local television news show, broadcast from 1976 to 1991 by WGBH, the Boston PBS affiliate. It replaced a pair of earlier news programs: The Reporters (1970-1973) and Evening Compass (1973-1974).

The show premiered on Thursday, January 15, 1976. Christopher Lydon became host of the program in 1977; his co-hosts included Gail Harris (1984-1987) and Carmen Fields (1987-1991). It won its first New England Emmy Award in 1978. Ultimately, the show and staff would win eight, including three for Best News Program.

A Boston Globe 1991 editorial viewed the program as distinctive among television news broadcasts: "The show produces deeper reports on the joys and hardships of the city's poorer neighborhoods than customarily seen on the commercial channels." A Globe editorial on the occasion of the show's cancellation wrote, "No other channel has approached the oddities and village politics of this city -- its cultural, religious and intellectual life included -- with more curiosity, energy, intelligence, and daring. The WGBH news audience . . . is diverse, cutting into gritty neighborhoods as well as upscale precincts of academe. Across the board it is an audience of thinking people."

WGBH President Henry P. Becton Jr., explained the show's cancellation: "The downturn in the New England economy has finally caught up with WGBH, forcing us to make some hard choices about the way in which we serve our local community." The final broadcast aired on Thursday, May 30, 1991.

From the fall of 1978 through May 1980, WGBY-TV, WGBH's sister station in Springfield, broadcast the program, opting in and out of the feed from Boston to insert locally produced news and features about Western Massachusetts.
