= WFSS =

WUNC public radio station in Fayetteville, North Carolina

Simulcast of WUNC, Chapel Hill

Fayetteville, North Carolina; United States
- Broadcast area: Fayetteville
- Frequency: 91.9 MHz (HD Radio)

Programming
- Format: Public radio
- Subchannels: HD2: BBC World Service

Ownership
- Owner: University of North Carolina at Chapel Hill; (WUNC Public Radio, LLC)

History
- First air date: 1977 (at 89.1)
- Former frequencies: 89.1 MHz (1977–1993)
- Call sign meaning: Fayetteville State

Technical information
- Licensing authority: FCC
- Facility ID: 21241
- Class: C1
- ERP: 100,000 watts
- HAAT: 107 meters (351 ft)
- Transmitter coordinates: 35°4′22.6″N 78°53′26.1″W
- Translator(s): 94.1 W231AB (Lumberton)

Links
- Public license information: Public file; LMS
- Webcast: Listen live
- Website: www.wunc.org

WFSS (91.9 FM) is a public radio station in Fayetteville, North Carolina, broadcasting National Public Radio programming originating from WUNC. It was owned by Fayetteville State University until May 2015, when it was purchased by the University of North Carolina at Chapel Hill and turned into a WUNC satellite.

In its final years as a separately programmed station, WFSS programmed jazz as well as an eclectic mix of formats on the weekend, including bluegrass, Gospel, blues, African and Latin music. It serves Fayetteville and twelve surrounding counties.

== History ==
In 1977, WFSS began broadcasting at 10 watts, and was operated by students using the station to prepare them for broadcasting careers. Its coverage area was limited to a two-mile radius of campus. In February 1983, power was increased to 100,000 watts, and the station joined NPR. From the beginning the station played jazz but went on to offer a wide variety of programming including blues, reggae and rhythm and blues. Joseph Ross, who came from Monrovia, Liberia, was the station manager from 1977 until the 1980s and again starting in 1995.

In March 1993, in order to switch from 89.1 to 91.9 and reduce interference to WECT in Wilmington (whose transmitter was located in Bladen County), WFSS signed off for five days and then came back at 30,000 watts before finally returning to full power at 100,000 watts.

On January 20, 2000, a winter storm caused significant damage to broadcasting equipment, and WFSS came back days later at 60 watts. The return to full power happened May 5 after $45,000 in repairs.

Funding reductions to Fayetteville State from 2009 onward caused WFSS to lose money. Even with the presence of Fort Bragg, the Fayetteville area was just barely large enough to support a standalone NPR member station. By 2014, all efforts to increase community support had come up short of the levels needed for the station to stay independent. On May 13, 2015, Fayetteville State trustees unanimously voted to sell WFSS to UNC Chapel Hill for $1.35 million. The deal was intended to preserve public radio in the region. Though the sale still required Federal Communications Commission approval, WUNC's licensee, WUNC Public Radio, LLC, took over WFSS' operations under a local management agreement. This allowed WFSS to begin simulcasting WUNC at 10 a.m. on May 13, hours after the trustee vote. Until the FCC approved the deal, Fayetteville State was required to keep an FCC-minimum skeleton crew of two employees (one manager and engineer) on site. The sale was consummated on November 24, 2015.

== Translator ==
Call sign	Frequency	City of license	FID	ERP (W)	HAAT	Class	Transmitter coordinates	FCC info
W231AB	94.1 FM	Lumberton, North Carolina	22655	80	38 m (125 ft)	D	34°38′20.5″N 79°0′31.1″W	LMS
