= Upper Cape Cod Regional Technical School =

Coordinates: 41°44′43.4″N 70°34′43.6″W

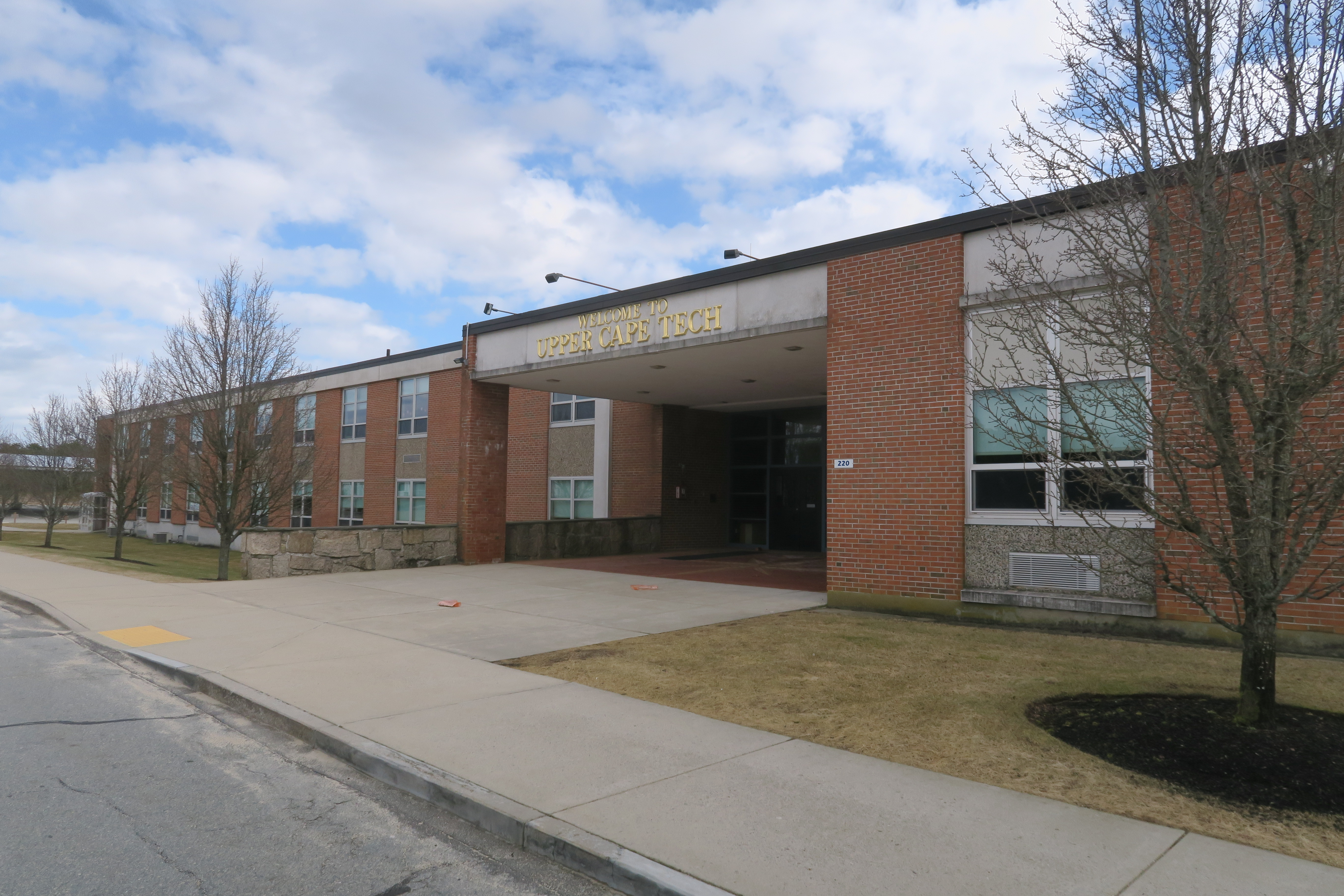
- Upper Cape Cod Regional Technical School
- 220 Sandwich Road; Bourne, Massachusetts 02532; United States

Information
- Type: Public
- Established: 1964
- Superintendent: Roger Forget
- Principal: Josh Greeley
- Teaching staff: 85.9 (FTE)
- Grades: 9–12
- Enrollment: 838 (2024–25)
- Colors: Blue & White
- Mascot: Rams
- Communities served: Bourne, Falmouth, Sandwich, Wareham, Marion
- Website: https://www.uppercapetech.com

Upper Cape Cod Regional Technical School (also known as Upper Cape Tech, UCT, or simply Upper Cape) is a public vocational-technical high school located in Bourne, Massachusetts, United States. Opened in 1966, it served over 830 students in 15 vocational areas of study in the 2024-2025 school year. The school is approved by the Massachusetts Department of Education to offer Chapter around 15 technical programs.

As a regional school, Upper Cape Cod Tech functions as its own district and serves students from five nearby communities, all of which are located in the Upper Cape region of Cape Cod. Upper Cape Tech serves students from the towns of Bourne, Falmouth, Sandwich, Wareham, and Marion.

Upper Cape Tech also hosts Doran Park, home field of the Cape Cod Baseball League's Bourne Braves.

== Demographics ==
According to Massachusetts Department of Elementary and Secondary Education annual statistics, for the 2024–2025 academic year, the demographic enrollment distributions for race, gender and grade level at Upper Cape Cod Regional Technical School are as follows:

Total number of enrolled students: 838
Total number of full-time equivalent educators: 85.9
Therefore, the student to teacher ratio for this school is 9.8:1

Enrollment by Race/Ethnicity (2024–2025)
Race	Enrolled Pupils*	% of District
African American	24	2.9%
Asian	7	0.8%
Hispanic	74	8.8%
Native American	7	0.8%
White	673	80.3%
Native Hawaiian, Pacific Islander	1	0.1%
Multi-Race, Non-Hispanic	52	6.2%
Total	838	100%

* Approximate number of enrolled pupils is calculated based on total number of students in district, multiplied by reported percentage, and rounded to nearest whole student.

Enrollment by gender (2024–2025)
Gender	Enrolled pupils	Percentage
Female	334	39.86%
Male	500	59.67%
Non-binary	4	0.48%
Total	838	100%

Enrollment by Grade
Grade	Pupils Enrolled	Percentage
9	229	27.33%
10	218	26.01%
11	209	24.94%
12	182	21.72%
SP*	0	0%
Total	838	100%

* SP = Special Education Beyond Grade 12

== Technical programs ==
Upper Cape Tech currently offers 15 vocational and technical shop programs to students. The offered shops are listed below:

- Automotive Collision Repair
- Automotive Technology
- Carpentry
- Cosmetology
- Culinary Arts
- Electrical
- Engineering Technology
- Environmental Science & Technology
- Health Technology
- Heating, Ventilation & Air Conditioning
- Horticulture & Landscape Contracting
- Information Technology
- Marine Technology
- Plumbing & Heating
- Veterinary Science

== Athletics ==
Upper Cape fielded its first football team after the co-op with Bourne High School was disbanded in 2010. They went 4–4 under a JV schedule and played their first varsity game on November 22, 2010 against Cape Cod Regional Technical High School. Upper Cape fielded a varsity team in 2011 and joined the Mayflower League. In Upper Cape Tech's first varsity season, the team finished with a 2–8 record. Upper Cape also fielded a JV and Freshman football team that fall.

In 2012, in just the football team's second varsity season, the Rams finished the regular season with a 9–1 record and won the Mayflower Small League Championship. They clinched a berth in the Massachusetts Division 5 State Championship game against Dorchester, who came into the game undefeated at 10–0. Led by their All-State running back Jon Dumont, the Rams beat Dorchester by a score of 22–8, winning their first state championship in football. The win was also Upper Cape's first state championship in any sport in the school's history. The Rams finished the season with a 10–1 record and were ranked 25th in the state.

The football team has continued to assert itself as a strong small school program, qualifying for the playoffs again in 2013.

In 2016, the football team won their first Vocational Small State Championship by defeating Blue Hills by a score of 22–14.

Upper Cape Tech offers numerous sports for students. Listed below are the sports that Upper Cape offers to students.

Sports:

- Fall
  - Football
  - Boys Soccer
  - Girls Soccer
  - Cross Country
  - Golf
  - Girls Volleyball
  - Cheerleading
- Winter
  - Girls Basketball
  - Boys Basketball
  - Boys Hockey
  - Swimming (Co-op with Old Rochester Regional High School)
  - Wrestling
- Spring
  - Baseball
  - Boys Lacrosse
  - Softball
  - Girls Lacrosse
