= WRQM =

WUNC public radio station in Rocky Mount, North Carolina

- Rocky Mount, North Carolina; United States
- Broadcast area: Rocky Mount
- Frequency: 90.9 MHz (HD Radio)
- Branding: WUNC, North Carolina Public Radio

Programming
- Format: Public radio
- Affiliations: NPR

Ownership
- Owner: University of North Carolina at Chapel Hill; (WUNC Public Radio, LLC)

History
- First air date: April 1992 (as WESQ)
- Former call signs: WESQ (1992–1996)
- Call sign meaning: Rocky Mount

Technical information
- Licensing authority: FCC
- Facility ID: 49158
- Class: C2
- ERP: 7,500 watts
- HAAT: 191 meters (627 ft)
- Transmitter coordinates: 35°48′40.6″N 77°44′31.9″W

Links
- Public license information: Public file; LMS
- Webcast: Listen live
- Website: www.wunc.org

WRQM (90.9 FM) is a radio station broadcasting National Public Radio (NPR) programming. Licensed to Rocky Mount, North Carolina, and owned by the University of North Carolina at Chapel Hill, it serves the Rocky Mount area as a full-time satellite of WUNC-FM in Chapel Hill. The station has been owned by WUNC since 1999 and operated as a straight simulcast of WUNC since 2001, though for its first seven years it was an independent public radio station based in Rocky Mount.

== History ==
=== At North Carolina Wesleyan College ===
On November 1, 1988, North Carolina Wesleyan College applied for a construction permit to build a new radio station in Rocky Mount. The station was conceived to fill the void left when WVSP, which was licensed to Warrenton but had moved its studios to Rocky Mount in 1985, shuttered in 1987. The college had initially gotten involved in efforts to keep WVSP in operation, but instead, it put together a new community group to build a new public radio station; among the members in 1989 were several people formerly associated with Sound and Print United, which owned WVSP.

WESQ was granted its construction permit in 1990, and the station was taking shape in temporary facilities - a trailer beside the NCWC Student Activities Center - by 1991. Wesleyan was in the process of building a new fine arts building to house the station and a 1,200-seat auditorium. The station signed on in April 1992; in November, it brought NPR programming back to the region through a collaboration with WTEB in New Bern.

=== Friends of Down East Public Radio ===
The station's history took a turn in 1995 when North Carolina Wesleyan College decided to cease funding the station and cut all ties; the school said it had failed to find a way to integrate WESQ into its curriculum and that running costs had been too high. A not-for-profit business group, Friends of Down East Public Radio, Inc., stepped in to buy the station from NCWC.

Friends of Down East signed a lease agreement to move WESQ off the NCWC campus and into a city-owned building at downtown Rocky Mount that was formerly the headquarters of the Coastal Plains Life Insurance Company, though the property was also the site of a proposed library that would have required its demolition. The station went off the air on December 25 in order to prepare for the move to the new site, where a 180-foot (55 m) tower donated by the city of Tarboro was erected so the station could send programs to the transmitter.

On April 1, 1996, the station returned as WRQM with NPR newsman and North Carolina native Carl Kasell joining local dignitaries, but the transmitter failed after two hours and the station returned to the air the next day. However, fundraising contributions were not as high as initially hoped; the 1997 spring fundraiser, while labeled a "success", still missed its goal by nearly $10,000. Additionally, the station had fewer than five full-time staff, which almost prompted NPR to drop the station as a full member for not meeting its criteria.

=== Sale to WUNC ===
In September 1998, the city of Rocky Mount began preparing to construct the library planned for the WRQM studio site. While the station was able to find a potential location for a new studio, a studio-to-transmitter link to the transmitter site on Temperance Road could not be set up from the proposed new facilities. Furthermore, the station was $135,000 in debt. By December, it was apparent that there were not enough listeners in the area for the station to be viable as a standalone NPR member. Friends of Down East Public Radio began weighing two merger offers: one from WTEB (by now calling itself Public Radio East) and one from WUNC. The board unanimously selected the WUNC bid.

WUNC announced its intention to continue to offer local programming on WRQM. On March 24, 1999, WUNC began programming the station from Chapel Hill under a time-share agreement, with two workers and a handful of local productions continuing in Rocky Mount for the time being. However, because of the loss of the former WRQM studios and state contracting policies preventing WUNC from leasing space for a studio in Rocky Mount, WUNC was approved to convert WRQM into a full-time satellite in 2001; since then, the station has been a straight simulcast of WUNC, with its call letters only mentioned during hourly legal IDs. The move expanded WUNC's footprint to Greenville, which gets grade B coverage from WRQM; previously, the only source of NPR programming in that city was a translator of WTEB.
