= This Is Love (podcast) =

American true love podcast

This is Love
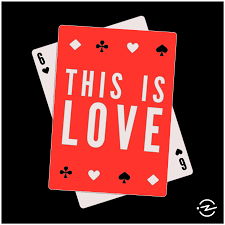

Cast and voices
- Hosted by: Phoebe Judge

Music
- Theme music composed by: Blue Dot Sessions

Production
- Production: Phoebe Judge; Lauren Spohrer; Nadia Wilson

Publication
- No. of seasons: 6
- No. of episodes: 71 (as of August 2023)
- Original release: February 2018

Related
- Website: thisislovepodcast.com

This is Love is a podcast created by Phoebe Judge, Lauren Spohrer, and Nadia Wilson, producers of Criminal. The series investigates stories of love.

The team started to work on the production of This is Love in Fall 2017. The six-episode first season launched in February 2018, on Valentine's Day. Season two started in November 2018, and the third season in May 2019.

Julienne Alexander makes original illustrations for each episode of This is Love.

== Critical reception ==
The Guardian described This is Love as "beautifully paced, with memorable details." USA Today wrote, "Like Criminal, This Is Love is a careful combination of interviews, music and Judge's narration that makes for a seamless and satisfying listening experience. But the new show has a different tone: It's warmer." New York Magazine said "Fans should expect the team to apply the same expansive, thoughtful, and near-anthropological approach to the lighter subject of love." Refinery29 called it a "warm, story-based podcast to listen to when the news is too much to bear." Entertainment Tonight called it "an intriguing must-listen."
