= On Point =

American public radio news show

- Genre: News: analysis, commentary, features, interviews, specials
- Running time: c. 55 min.
- Country of origin: United States
- Language: English
- Home station: WBUR
- Syndicates: American Public Media
- Hosted by: Meghna Chakrabarti
- Created by: Graham Griffith
- Recording studio: Boston, Massachusetts
- Original release: September 17, 2001 – present
- Website: onpoint.wbur.org
- Podcast: Podcast/RSS feed

On Point is a radio show produced by WBUR-FM in Boston, Massachusetts, and syndicated by American Public Media (APM). The show addresses a wide range of issues from news, politics, arts and culture, health, technology, environmental, and business topics, to many others.

It is distributed to over 290 public radio stations across the United States by APM. On Point averages more than two million podcast downloads a month.

The show was originally created by Graham Griffith, and first broadcast on September 17, 2001, to provide special coverage in response to the September 11, 2001 attacks. The show's popularity led to it becoming a standalone program, first broadcasting under the On Point name on February 4, 2002.

It was originally a two-hour call-in show, but the show transitioned to its current one-hour format in October 2020.

== Tom Ashbrook ==
Tom Ashbrook was the long-running host from 2002 to 2017. Prior to that he was a foreign editor at The Boston Globe.

Ashbrook hosted most weeks during his time with the show, but went on medical leave in November 2007, to undergo heart bypass surgery. He resumed full-time broadcasting on January 2, when he discussed his medical journey in a show with his doctors and nurses.

On November 5, 2014, Ashbrook announced a period of personal leave to care for his wife, Danielle, who had been suffering from cancer. She died the next day, November 6, 2014, at age 60. After nearly two months away, Ashbrook returned to On Point on January 2, 2015.

Ashbrook was put on leave from On Point at the beginning of December 2017, when a group of current and former WBUR employees alleged he created a "toxic and emotionally unsafe work environment" for staff through bullying and publicly humiliating colleagues. Specific allegations filed by initially 11 (and later "at least 23") staffers included "Tirades directed at young women in the studio, name-calling, belittling critiques of show ideas during meetings, 'creepy' sex talk, inappropriate touching, hugs and back or neck rubs after a dressing down." Ashbrook denies the allegations. In 2018 the program commenced being hosted by fill-in hosts including Ray Suarez and Jane Clayson.

On February 14, 2018, WBUR announced they had dismissed Ashbrook as a result of the complaints about the work environment.

== Since Tom Ashbrook's departure ==
On July 25, 2018, WBUR's Meghna Chakrabarti (host of the local program Radio Boston) and David Folkenflik (NPR's media correspondent) were announced as the new hosts of the program starting August 20. Chakrabarti hosted Mondays through Thursdays while Folkenflik would host Fridays and remain as NPR's media correspondent.

In a memo issued July 1, 2020, WBUR CEO Margaret Low announced that the show would be reduced to one hour from two; no longer have live call-in from listeners; feature more highly produced, pre-recorded portions; and no longer have David Folkenflik as host of the show on Fridays, leaving Meghna Chakrabarti as sole host. The memo went on to assert that the changes were not related to pandemic-related budget shortfalls that have necessitated staff and programming cuts at WBUR, and that the same number of staff would produce the single hour of On Point as currently produce two hours. At the time of the memo, On Point was aired by 285 stations, with 159 airing both hours.

As of 2021, the show is now being distributed by American Public Media.

== Notable coverage ==
The show traveled to Shanghai, People's Republic of China, to broadcast a week of programming from April 14 to 18, 2008. Topics ranged from the Beijing Olympics to Chinese cinema. Among the guests were leading China analysts, officials and journalists. A new website was launched to coincide with the trip.

In the run-up to the 2008 presidential campaign, the show interviewed Barack Obama, John McCain, Mike Huckabee, John Edwards, Ron Paul, Joe Biden, Chris Dodd and Sam Brownback. Election commentators included Donna Brazile, Tom Brokaw, Bob Shrum, Dana Milbank, Tony Fabrizio, Joe Klein, EJ Dionne, Pat Buchanan, Peter Hart, and Hendrik Hertzberg. The show traveled to both the Democratic and Republican conventions, broadcasting live in the morning and at night.

== Time and location ==
On Point is broadcast live from Boston, Massachusetts on WBUR FM (90.9 MHz) from 10 to 11 a.m. ET, occupying the former time slot of The Connection, and repeats from 7 to 8 p.m.

Friday's show almost always consists of an analysis of the previous week's news headlines. The Friday news analysis segments usually feature senior editor of The Atlantic Monthly and historian Jack Beatty as a news analyst, as well as, typically, two or three other guest commentators.

As of 2021, the previously stated “Week in the News” segments no longer exist. Nowadays Beatty will be featured in single topic episodes, but is not part of a panel of reporters and journalists discussing weekly events.

Jane Clayson, former CBS morning anchor and correspondent, is commonly the show's fill-in host; NPR's Jacki Lyden, John Harwood, Anthony Brooks, Jessica Yellin, James Hattori, and Ray Suarez have also hosted.

It is led by senior producer Karen Shiffman and directed by Eileen Imada.

The original On Point theme music, "Everything Is Alright", came from the Four Tet album Pause. It has since been dropped from the show as of 2020.
