= Lauren Spohrer =

American radio producer

- Education: Columbia University; Florida State University
- Known for: Criminal (podcast); This Is Love (podcast)

Lauren Spohrer is an American radio producer, best known for co-creating and producing the podcasts Criminal and This Is Love.

== Early career and education ==
Spohrer got her start in radio in 2003, when she began interning for Weekend Edition Saturday on NPR. After working as a producer for several NPR shows, she began a Master of Fine Arts at Columbia University.

== Creation of Criminal and This is Love podcasts ==
Spohrer, who teaches essay writing at Duke University, was working as the producer of The Story with Dick Gordon, when the show was cancelled in 2013. This led Spohrer and two colleagues, Phoebe Judge and Eric Mennel, to create their own podcast. Spohrer proposed to Judge that they create a podcast related to true crime, and they released the first episode of Criminal in January 2014. Spohrer and Judge went on to co-create another podcast, This is Love, in 2018. Spohrer and Judge have been in discussions with United Talent Agency to turn their podcasts into scripted shows.
