= WVSP (North Carolina) =

Public radio station in Warrenton–Rocky Mount, North Carolina (1976–1987)

- Warrenton, North Carolina; United States
- Broadcast area: Rocky Mount, North Carolina
- Frequency: 90.9 MHz

Programming
- Format: Public radio
- Affiliations: NPR

Ownership
- Owner: Sound and Print United, Inc.

History
- First air date: August 26, 1976
- Last air date: 1987
- Call sign meaning: "Voices Serving People"

Technical information
- Class: C
- ERP: 100,000 watts
- HAAT: 500 ft (150 m)
- Transmitter coordinates: 36°14′35″N 77°58′12″W

WVSP was a public radio station that broadcast on 90.9 FM in Warrenton, North Carolina. The station was owned and operated by Sound and Print United and operated from 1976 to 1987; it was perpetually challenged by poor community support for the station, even after it moved its studio facilities to Rocky Mount in the mid-1980s.

== History ==
Sound and Print United, Inc., applied for a new noncommercial radio station in Warrenton on December 14, 1973, despite none of its principals having any experience in radio. The call letters WMIP were assigned to the station originally, but before going on air, they were changed to WVSP, for "Voices Serving People". The station initially broadcast with 50,000 watts from its tower halfway between Warrenton and Rocky Mount, near Essex, North Carolina. The station's first studios were located on the second floor of a building previously used by two doctors, on Franklin Street in downtown Warrenton, with Sound and Print's print shop occupying the first floor; 75 percent of the original equipment cost was covered by a federal grant.

WVSP began broadcasting on August 26, 1976. It was an NPR member station and aired All Things Considered along with its own local news and community programming and jazz music. In 1980, the station was granted a power increase to 100,000 watts.

Throughout its decade on the air, WVSP struggled with a chronic shortage of community support; the station's potential audience was just barely large enough for it to be viable. The station was unusual among its noncommercial peers in the fact that it served a mostly rural region; additionally, most of the station's management was black. As early as 1977, the station was suffering from a variety of financial and technical problems, as stated in its own mailings. As a result, and in order to move closer to the center of its listening audience, the station embarked in September 1983 on a campaign to relocate its studios from Warrenton to Rocky Mount, where it hoped to obtain a wider volunteer base and increased community and corporate support. The move was in part funded by a $25,000 challenge grant from the Mary Reynolds Babcock Foundation of Winston-Salem that required WVSP to raise the remaining $155,000. Abbott Laboratories, which owns a facility in Rocky Mount, donated $5,000 in support of the campaign, as did Belk Tyler; Hardee's made a $20,000 contribution. However, the station expressed disappointment at the poor response to raise the remainder of the funds needed to cover moving expenses. In July 1984, the station took an option to purchase the Hodgin Building at 230 Tarboro Street in Rocky Mount. However, the move was not completed until November 1985 owing to slow fundraising and building renovations.

The move to Rocky Mount would not be enough to save WVSP. At NPR's 1986 public meeting, the national organization voted to disconnect WVSP for not paying its distribution/interconnection fees. On December 15, the station temporarily ceased operations for technical and financial reasons, not returning until January 15, 1987. By that fall, however, the station had ceased operations for good, and it was being reported that creditors were seeking a person connected with WVSP's operations.

North Carolina Wesleyan College became involved in efforts to keep WVSP afloat, but when the station ultimately failed, Wesleyan and people previously associated with Sound and Print United applied to build a new public radio station licensed to Rocky Mount; this station, WESQ, went on air in April 1992 and was sold by the college to a local non-profit group in 1995, becoming WRQM, which remained on the air for another three years as a locally owned NPR member station before merging with repeater of WUNC-FM in Chapel Hill in 1999; it has been a WUNC repeater since 2001.
