= Doran Park (ballpark) =

Baseball venue in Bourne, Massachusetts, U.S.

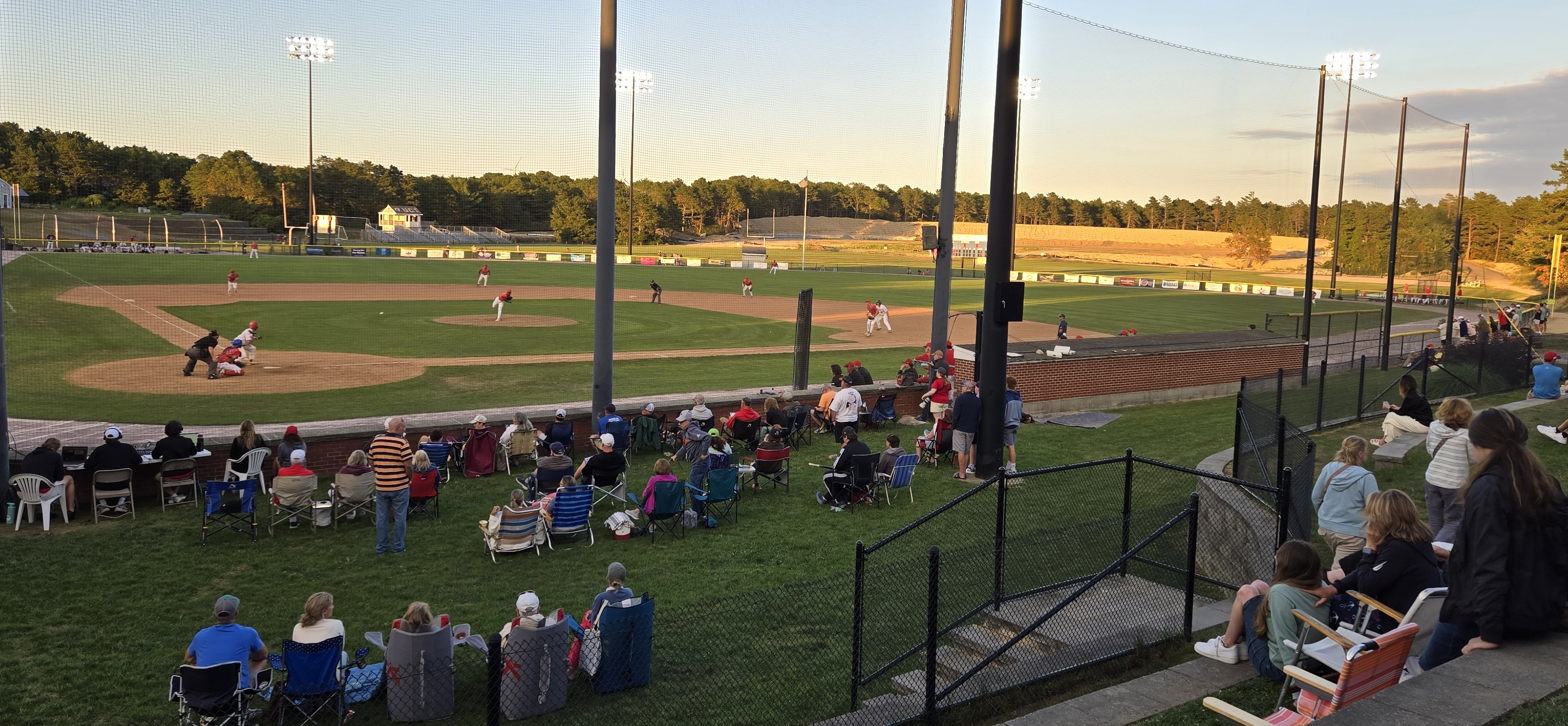
- View from the berm on the first base side
- Interactive map of Doran Park
- Address: 220 Sandwich Road
- Location: Bourne, Massachusetts, U.S.
- Coordinates: 41.744322°N 70.577803°W
- Capacity: 3,000
- Surface: Grass
- Field size: Left Field: 325 ft Center Field: 390 ft Right Field: 315 ft

Construction
- Opened: 2006

Tenant
- Bourne Braves

Doran Park is a baseball venue in Bourne, Massachusetts, the centerpiece of the Barry J. Motta Athletic Complex at Upper Cape Cod Regional Technical School, and home to the Bourne Braves of the Cape Cod Baseball League (CCBL).

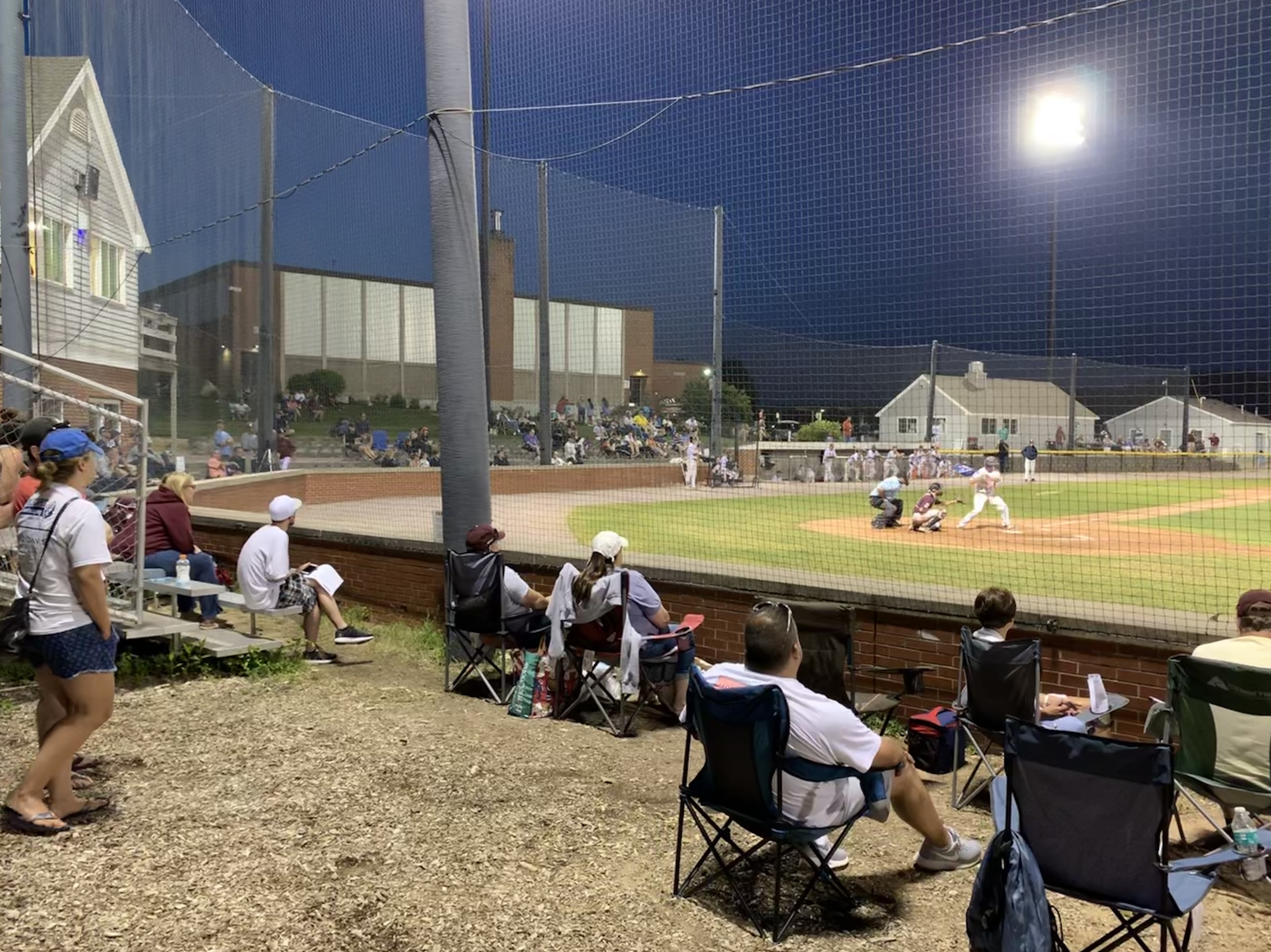
Doran Park in July 2019

The Bourne Braves began play on the newly-constructed field in 2006, after having previously played home games at Coady School field and Massachusetts Maritime Academy's Hendy Field since the team's inception in 1988. In a 2007 Braves pre-game ceremony, the new ballpark was dedicated as "Doran Park" in memory of long-time baseball fan and Sagamore resident, George Doran, Sr., and was touted as "the model for the Cape League’s future." The following season, the Braves held a lighting ceremony to celebrate the park's new minor league caliber lighting system, a gift from the Doran family. Among the speakers at the 2008 event was former Bourne Brave and Boston Red Sox player Lou Merloni.

Doran Park was host to the CCBL championship series in 2009, as the Braves defeated the Cotuit Kettleers to claim the first league championship in franchise history. In 2014, the CCBL all-star game festivities were held at Doran, the first time the Braves had hosted the event. The park again hosted the CCBL title series in 2017, as the Braves fell to the Brewster Whitecaps. The ballpark has been the summertime home of dozens of future major leaguers such as Mitch Moreland, Travis Jankowski, and Pete Alonso.

== See also ==
- Bourne Braves
- Cape Cod Baseball League
