= James D. Griffioen =

American writer and photographer (born 1977)

James D. Griffioen (born February 4, 1977) is an American writer and photographer who resides in Detroit, Michigan. He is the main contributor to the blog Sweet Juniper.

Griffioen was born in Kalamazoo, Michigan, and attended Western Michigan University, Trinity College Dublin, and the University of Michigan Law School. After practicing law in San Francisco, California, in 2006, Griffioen moved with his family to Detroit, Michigan where he now considers himself a "Gentleman of Elegant Leisure." Griffioen's blog earns ad revenue through Federated Media Publishing.

Griffioen's photography has appeared in Harper's Magazine, Vice Magazine, The Baffler, Time, Fortune, Landscape Architecture Magazine, CS Interiors, New York Magazine, Boing Boing, The New Yorker.com, and The Atlantic.com. Griffioen is known for his photographs of Detroit, Michigan. His essays have appeared in several books, including "Long Live the Weeds and the Wilderness Yet" in Things I Learned About My Dad: In Therapy, edited by Heather B. Armstrong # ISBN 0-7582-1659-9 # ISBN 978-0-7582-1659-5 and "El Corazon" in What I Would Tell Her, edited by Andrea N. Richesin # ISBN 0-373-89210-1 # ISBN 978-0-373-89210-5.

Griffioen has appeared as a guest on American Public Media's The Story with Dick Gordon, as well as the BBC program Americana and CBC Radio One's arts program Q.
