= WSDH =

Radio station at Sandwich High School in Sandwich, Massachusetts

Simulcast of WKKL
- Sandwich, Massachusetts; United States
- Broadcast area: Cape Cod
- Frequency: 91.5 MHz
- Branding: "Cape Cod's Classic Alternative"

Programming
- Format: Community radio

Ownership
- Owner: Sandwich, Massachusetts Public Schools
- Operator: Cape Cod Community College

History
- First air date: 1976
- Call sign meaning: Sandwich

Technical information
- Licensing authority: FCC
- Facility ID: 59002
- Class: A
- ERP: 310 watts
- HAAT: 46 meters (151 ft)
- Transmitter coordinates: 41°44′6.3″N 70°27′33″W

Links
- Public license information: Public file; LMS

WSDH (91.5 FM) is a high school radio station licensed to Sandwich, Massachusetts, United States, and serving the Cape Cod area. The station is owned by Sandwich, Massachusetts Public Schools. It is operated by Sandwich High School. WSDH had rebroadcast WBUR until 2014 and since the end of 2021 rebroadcasts 90.7 WKKL from Cape Cod Community College in West Barnstable.
