= Kenneth R. Fox Student Union =

Dining and residence hall at the University of Massachusetts Lowell

Kenneth R. Fox Hall
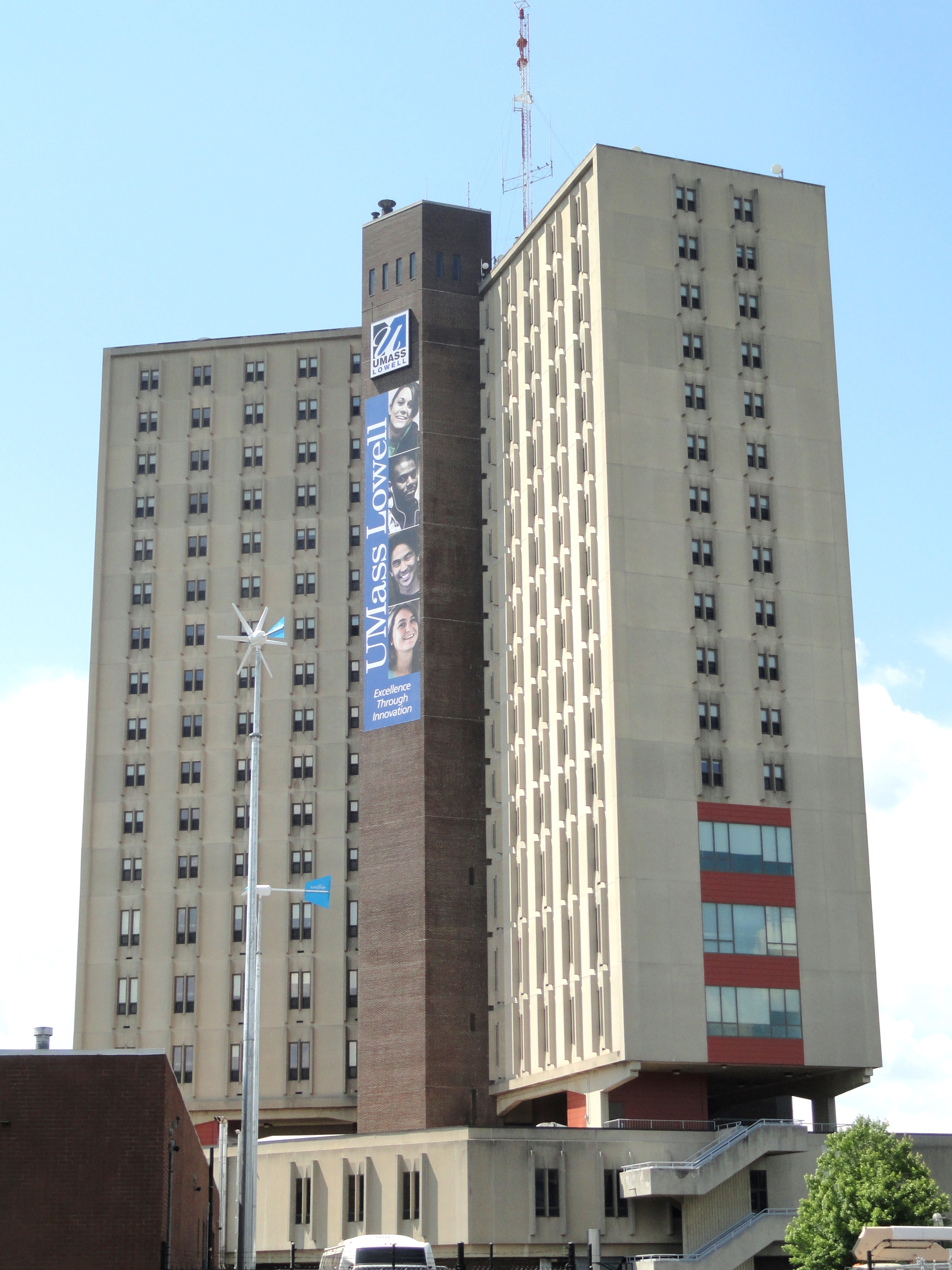
- Interactive map of the Kenneth R. Fox Hall area

General information
- Type: Residence Hall, communication
- Location: 100 Pawtucket Street; Lowell, Massachusetts 01854; United States
- Coordinates: 42.652148°N 71.320399°W
- Construction started: 1972
- Completed: 1973

Height
- Roof: 226 feet (69 meters)

Technical details
- Floor count: 18

Design and construction
- Architect: Perley F. Gilbert Associates

Kenneth R. Fox Hall, also known as Fox Hall, is a residence hall and student dining facility in Lowell, Massachusetts. It is within the residence hall cluster on the East Campus of the University of Massachusetts Lowell. At 18 stories and 226 feet (69 meters) in height, it is the tallest building in the city of Lowell. When it was built, it was known as the Lowell Technical Institute Dormitory. The building is home to more than 800 students and UMass Lowell's largest student-dining hall, Fox Dining Commons. The transmitter for the university's radio station, WUML, is located at Fox Hall.

The building is also the sixth-tallest tower residence hall in the University of Massachusetts system, as it is 18 stories, four shorter than the five, 22-story tower residence halls in the Southwest Residential Area at the University of Massachusetts Amherst.
