= Criminal (podcast) =

American true crime podcast

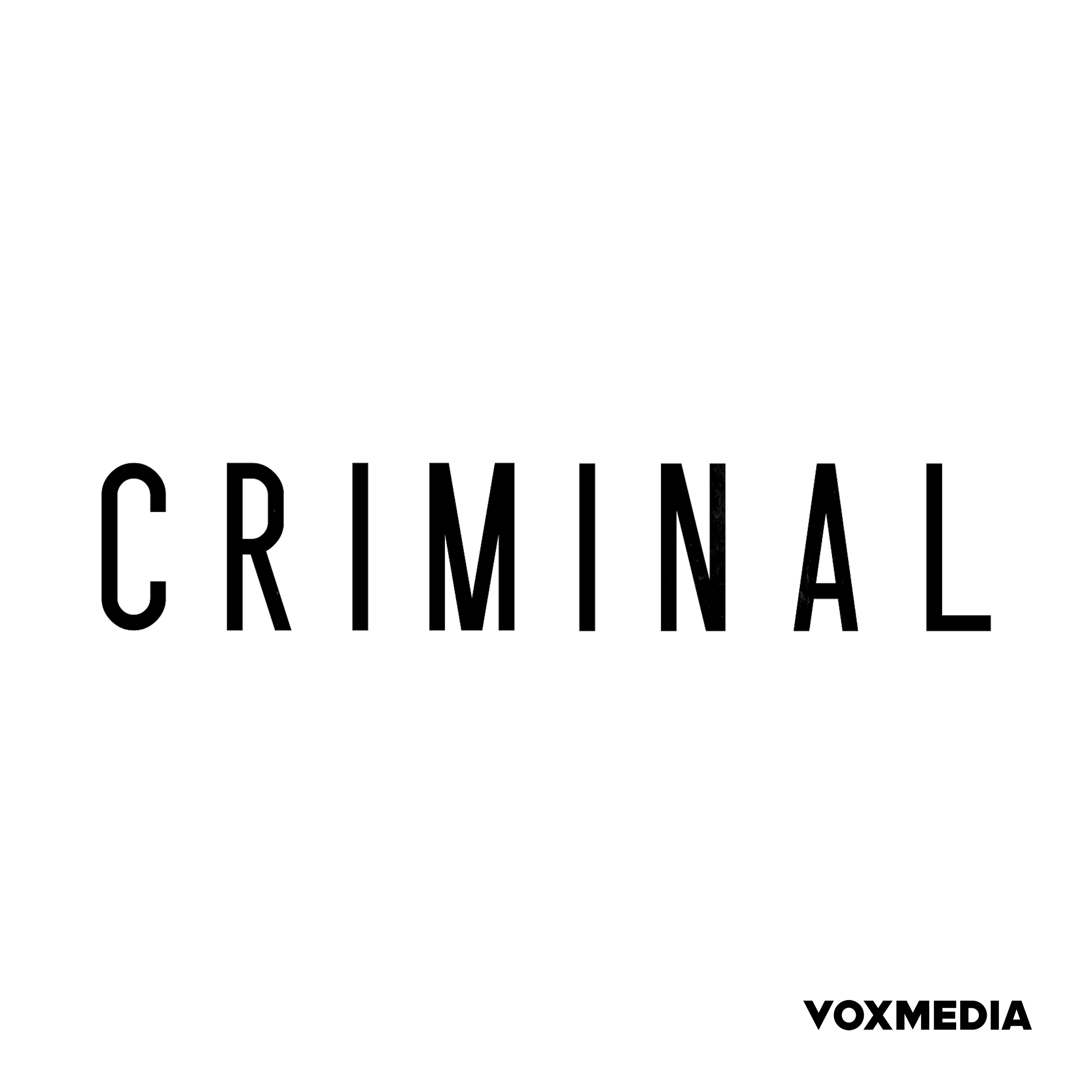
- Genre: True crime
- Language: English

Cast and voices
- Hosted by: Phoebe Judge

Production
- Production: Phoebe Judge; Lauren Spohrer; Nadia Wilson; Rob Byers

Publication
- Original release: January 2014
- Provider: Radiotopia; Vox Media Podcast Network (starting 2022)

Related
- Website: thisiscriminal.com

Criminal is a podcast that focuses on true crime. It is recorded in the studios of WUNC in Chapel Hill, NC, and is part of the Vox Media Podcast Network. The show describes itself as telling "stories of people who've done wrong, been wronged, or gotten caught somewhere in the middle."

== History and development ==
What we are hoping to be is, in some ways, a counter to a lot of the crime stories that we're seeing in the mass media, which we find sometimes to be sensationalistic and dramatized in a what that is, to us, sometimes exploitative, of people's stories.

— Phoebe Judge in an interview with The Boston Globe

Lauren Spohrer, Phoebe Judge, and Eric Mennel met while working on The Story with Dick Gordon at WUNC. After the program ended, they decided to make a podcast together. Remarking that there was an overlap between fans of podcasts and fans of the fictional procedural Law & Order, Spohrer suggested that they make their podcast about crime. The show launched in January 2014. Nadia Wilson came on as a producer who joined the show in September 2016. Meanwhile, Spohrer was working as a WUNC producer who was teaching essay writing at Duke University; Judge was anchoring the station's broadcast of the program Here & Now; and Mennel was a producer at All Things Considered.

In 2021, Criminal Productions, parent of Criminal, was acquired by Vox Media.

== Production ==
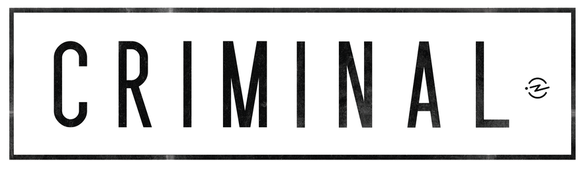
Podcast Logo

Criminal tells a different story in each episode across a wide range of topics. For example, the show has covered a mother-daughter coroner team and an African-American man who was wrongfully shot by police in front of his mother and father. Spohrer and Judge have said they find episodes by looking up topics they are interested in until they find one that may be suitable for the show. Then, they conduct a pre-interview with the subject to find out the person's willingness and suitability to be covered in the show. Once a story has been decided, the team will develop interview questions, and Judge conducts the interview, often in person. In-person interviews require travel and procurement of a studio. Then two will work on a rough draft, before presenting it to a third for input, so that, according to Judge, that person "can be a fresh set of ears." After the first long edit, there's a second draft, and a final edit. Judge records her narration, then Spohrer will edit the piece together. The first season was recorded in the closet bedrooms of either Spohrer's or Mennel's room.

In interviews, Judge has explained that episodes that center around a single interview or straightforward story can take as little as 25 hours to produce. But other stories that require more investigation can take up to 70 hours.

New episodes come out twice a month, on Fridays. Nadia Wilson is the senior producer, alongside assistant producer Susannah Roberson. Audio mixing is done by Rob Byers. Julienne Alexander makes original illustrations for each episode. The crew works on multiple episodes at a time.

== Reception ==
=== Critical reception ===
Criminal was described as "the best new radio show in America" in The Huffington Post, as "the thinking person's true crime podcast" in The News & Observer, and as "the purist's true crime series" in Time. Contrasting the program with the podcast Serial, Jason Loviglio of RadioDoc Review said that "cofounders and producers Lauren Spohrer and Phoebe Judge (and recently hired producer Nadia Wilson) ... [have] moved beyond mere crime journalism to something that aspires to a bit more philosophical heft", adding, "Original artwork by Julienne Alexander adds distinctive nuance."

Critics have included Criminal in lists of best podcasts. In its selection of "The 50 Best Podcasts of 2016", The Atlantic wrote, "Criminal's ethos sets the true-crime bar high." Criminal was chosen by Wired as one of the Best Podcasts of 2015, and was included twice in Vulture's annual lists: once on The 10 Best Podcasts and also the 10 Best Podcast Episodes of 2015, where it was described as "a true-crime podcast that understands crime as something sociological, historical, even anthropological — that crime is a function of people, time, and place." In March 2017, Entertainment Weekly included the program on its list of the best "true-crime” podcasts, and in 2021 Criminal was included in Vulture's 2021 list The 10 True-Crime Podcasts That Changed Everything. The New York Times included Criminal on their Best Podcasts of 2023 list, and in 2024 Entertainment Weekly ranked Criminal number 1 on its 30 best true crime podcasts of all-time list.

=== Awards ===
The episode "695-BGK" was one of nine award winners at the 2015 Third Coast International Audio Festival.

Criminal won the 2018 and 2019 Webby Award for Podcasts and Digital Audio. Criminal won both the 2020 Webby Award for Crime & Justice in the category Podcasts and the People's Voice Winner for the same category. Also in 2020, Criminal won the Discover Pods Award in the True Crime Podcast category.

== Tours ==
Criminal's first live show was held at the Motorco Music Hall in Durham, North Carolina, a venue which is within walking distance of Judge's home at the time.

In 2024, Criminal started their 10-year anniversary tour, which included live shows at the Fitzgerald Theater in Saint Paul, The Town Hall (New York City), the 2024 Tribeca Festival with guest Melissa McCarthy, the Boulder Theater in Boulder, Colorado, and the Academy of Music in Northampton, Massachusetts.

== See also ==
- List of American crime podcasts
