= WKKL =

Radio station in Massachusetts, United States

- West Barnstable, Massachusetts; United States
- Broadcast area: Hyannis, Massachusetts; Cape Cod
- Frequency: 90.7 MHz
- Branding: WKKL FM 90.7

Programming
- Format: Alternative rock, hip hop

Ownership
- Owner: Cape Cod Community College

History
- First air date: September 19, 1977

Technical information
- Licensing authority: FCC
- Facility ID: 8572
- Class: A
- ERP: 305 watts
- HAAT: 38 meters (125 ft)
- Transmitter coordinates: 41°41′31.3″N 70°20′14″W

Links
- Public license information: Public file; LMS
- Webcast: Listen live
- Website: www.wkkl.fm

WKKL (90.7 FM) is a radio station broadcasting a classic alternative rock format. Licensed to West Barnstable, Massachusetts, United States, the station serves the Cape Cod area. The station is owned by Cape Cod Community College. The station is used as part of the classroom setting for their Associate degree program in communications. The studios are located on the campus of Cape Cod Community College in the Makkay Broadcast Center.

In 1992, WKKL began simulcasting some hours of programming from WBUR, a public radio station in Boston. That relationship ended in 1999, due to WBUR's 1997 acquisition of the 1240 AM facility in West Yarmouth, the signal of which heavily overlaps with WKKL.

In late December 2019, WKKL stopped broadcasting on 90.7 FM due to damage to the station's radio tower. In fall of 2020, repair of the radio tower was made possible by a donation from the Cape Cod Community College Educational Foundation, and the station returned to the airwaves by late December 2020. Today, the station provides programming on air and online as students and alumni DJs are hosting shows featuring WKKL's classic alternative music format as well as a growing number of podcasts.
