= WBUR-FM =

Public radio station in Boston, Massachusetts

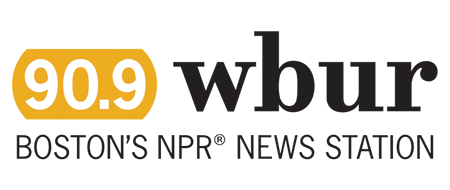
- Boston, Massachusetts; United States
- Broadcast area: Greater Boston
- Frequency: 90.9 MHz (HD Radio)
- Branding: 90.9 WBUR

Programming
- Format: News/talk
- Affiliations: NPR; Public Radio Exchange

Ownership
- Owner: Boston University; (The Trustees of Boston University)

History
- First air date: March 1, 1950
- Former call signs: WBUR (1950–1997)
- Call sign meaning: "Boston University Radio"

Technical information
- Licensing authority: FCC
- Facility ID: 68241
- Class: B
- ERP: 8,600 watts
- HAAT: 357.8 meters (1,174 feet)
- Transmitter coordinates: 42°18′37″N 71°14′12″W
- Repeater: (see table)

Links
- Public license information: Public file; LMS
- Webcast: Listen live; MP3; AAC
- Website: wbur.org

WBUR-FM (90.9 FM) is a public radio station located in Boston, Massachusetts, owned by Boston University. Its programming is also known as WBUR News. The station is the largest of three NPR member stations in Boston, along with WGBH and WUMB-FM and produces nationally distributed programs, including On Point and Here and Now. WBUR previously produced Car Talk, Only a Game, Open Source, and The Connection. Radio Boston, launched in 2007, is its only purely local show. WBUR's positioning statement is "Boston's NPR News Station". The station's transmitter is located on Cedar Street in Needham, while its studio is located inside WBUR CitySpace within the Lavine Broadcast Center on the Boston University campus on Commonwealth Avenue.

WBUR also carries its programming on two other stations serving Cape Cod and the Islands: WBUH (89.1 FM) in Brewster, and WBUA (92.7 FM) in Tisbury. The latter station, located on Martha's Vineyard, uses the frequency formerly occupied by WMVY. In 1998, the station helped launch WRNI in Providence, Rhode Island—the first NPR station within that state's borders. It has since sold the station to a local group.

According to Ken Mills, a Minneapolis broadcast consultant and Nielsen data, the number of WBUR listeners has grown since 2012, increasing from 409,000 to 534,400. In 2017, WBUR was named the sixth-most popular NPR news station in the United States.

== Programming ==
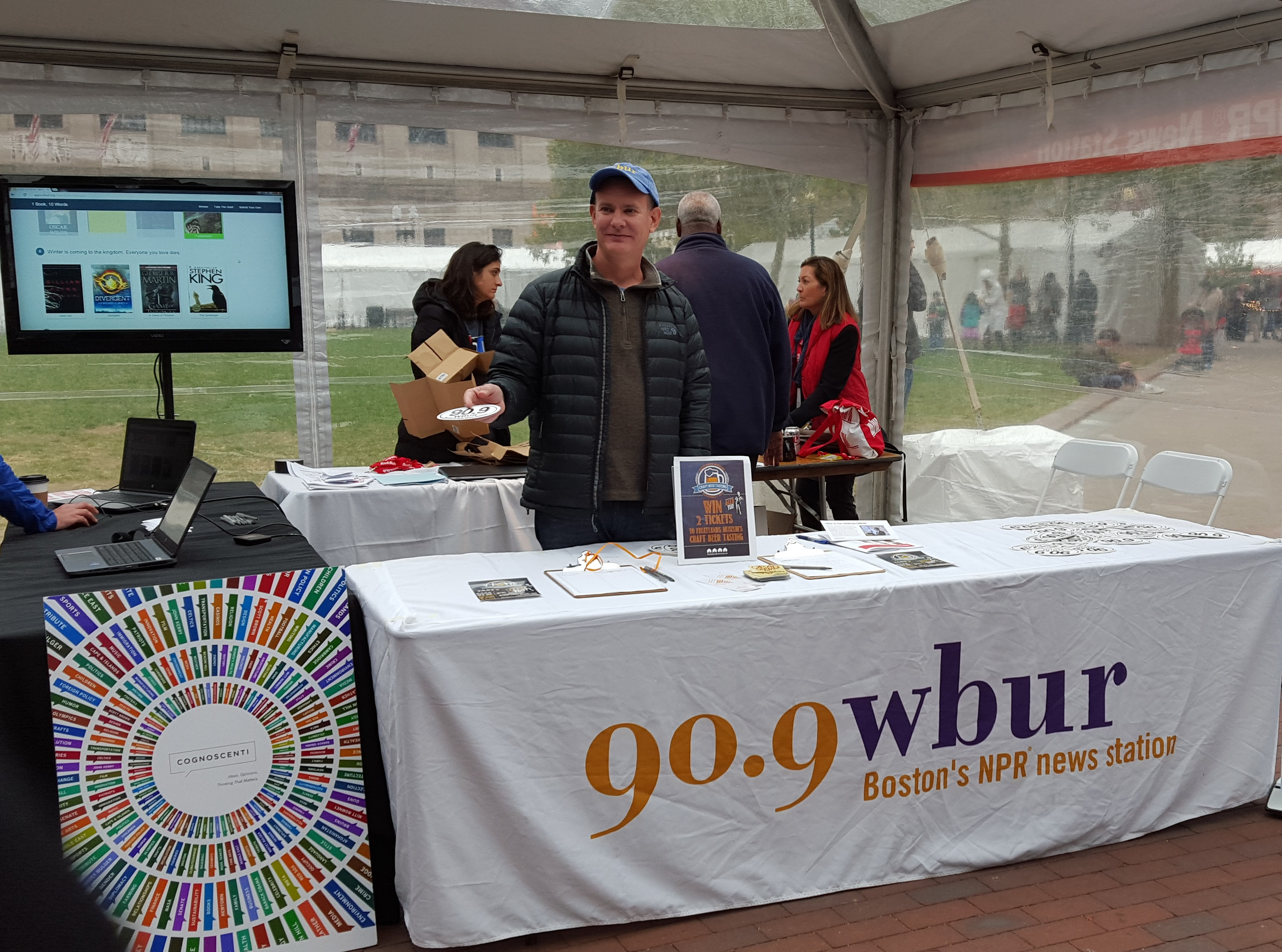
The WBUR-FM information booth at the 2015 Boston Book Festival

WBUR programs On Point and Here and Now are carried nationwide in the US on hundreds of public radio stations and on XM Radio's public radio station, XM Public Radio. In total, WBUR produces more than 25 hours of news and programming each week.

On Point is a one-hour discussion show formerly hosted by Tom Ashbrook, currently hosted by Meghna Chakrabarti, broadcast weekdays. It began as 'special programming' in the aftermath of the 9/11 attacks, originally airing from 7 to 9 p.m. It took over the time slot of the similar The Connection when that show was cancelled in 2005.

Here and Now is a news and culture digest show hosted by Scott Tong, Robin Young, and Deepa Fernandes, normally consisting of several interview segments with reporters, authors, artists and statesmen. It began as a regional and local show but soon expanded to cover national and international issues. The show is syndicated nationally by more than 400 other NPR member stations.

Open Source is a weekly show hosted by Christopher Lydon, former New York Times journalist and original host of The Connection. The show focuses on the arts, literature, and foreign affairs.

In 2007, WBUR launched Radio Boston, a weekly radio show featuring longtime Boston journalist David Boeri. The show was later hosted by Jane Clayson Johnson as a one-hour discussion and interview, though Boeri still introduced each show with a report from the field. In 2010, Radio Boston expanded to broadcast Monday through Friday. In the fall of 2010, new host Meghna Chakrabarti went on maternity leave and was temporarily replaced by WBUR reporter Sacha Pfeiffer. Chakrabarti returned to co-host the show with Anthony Brooks until she was elevated to host On Point. In June 2019, the station announced that Tiziana Dearing, a longtime commentator and contributor at the station, would be the permanent host of the program.

Only a Game was a weekly sports program broadcast twice on Saturdays. The show was hosted by Bill Littlefield until 2018 and was syndicated to about 210 affiliate stations by National Public Radio. The wide-ranging program described itself as "irreverent" and often covered sports from a human interest angle, rather than appealing directly to a particular fan base.

On Sunday evenings, WBUR-FM also broadcasts a show entitled Boston University's World of Ideas. The show features academics and intellectuals presenting lectures and answering questions on issues of national or global importance.

The three-minute comedy sketch series 11 Central Ave, broadcast on WBEZ in Chicago, was for a time recorded at WBUR.

WBUR began producing podcasts in 2014. Current productions include Dear Sugar Radio, an advice podcast with Cheryl Strayed and Steve Almond; and Modern Love, a partnership with The New York Times.

== History ==
WBUR first went on the air March 1, 1950, with studios and transmitter located at 84 Exeter Street in Boston. Initially, most of WBUR's staff were Boston University students, with the station broadcasting primarily classical, jazz and BU sporting events. In the early 1960s, the station moved from Exeter Street to the newly renovated School of Communications building at 640 Commonwealth Avenue. By the 1970s, WBUR began receiving funding from the Corporation For Public Broadcasting and became a "public radio station" with a professional staff. Volunteer BU students continued local programming on WTBU using unlicensed low-power carrier-current AM transmitters serving the BU residence halls. In 1997, the WBUR offices and studios moved to a new facility on the BU campus at 890 Commonwealth Avenue in Boston.

During the 1970s and 1980s, the station had several jazz music and classical music programs. The disc jockeys demonstrated a broad knowledge of composers, performers, and the execution of jazz, demonstrating familiarity with such matters as improvisation and shared this with listeners.' Noteworthy jazz and classical disc jockeys included Dennis Boyer (classical: FM in the PM), Steve Elman (jazz: Spaces), Tony Cennamo (jazz: New Morning and subsequently, a night-time show), James Isaacs (jazz), and Jose Masso (Latin: Con Salsa). One exception to this was the expansion of overnight programming, most notably the 2-to-6 Shift hosted By Kevin Vandenbroek and Bob King. It lasted about nine months when it was cancelled by the Station Manager Bonnie Cronin. This act led to the Director of Programming Victor S. Wheatman to resign.

At the end of the 1980s, WBUR began replacing many of its music programs with news and information programming from NPR, Public Radio International (which was merged into Public Radio Exchange in 2019) and the BBC. This brought WBUR into head-on competition with another major Boston-area NPR station, WGBH. WGBH eventually decided to retain a mostly music (classical music daytime/jazz nights) and cultural programming format (WBUR's former territory), although WGBH did broadcast NPR's Morning Edition and All Things Considered.

By the early 1990s, with the exception of Con Salsa on Saturday nights, WBUR had adopted an around-the-clock news and information format. Numerous NPR member stations have since followed WBUR's lead and eliminated music programming in favor of news and information programming (including rival WGBH, which transferred classical music programming to WCRB following its acquisition in 2009, though WGBH continued to program jazz at night until July 2012 and still airs a few hours of jazz on weekends). By 2009, the majority of NPR member stations were programming 24/7 news and information formats.

WBUR's main transmitter operates at 8,600 watts, which on paper is somewhat modest for a full NPR member on the FM band. However, due to its antenna's height of 1,174 feet (358 m) and configuration, WBUR broadcasts with an effective radiated power of 60,000 watts. It decently covers much of eastern Massachusetts, though it does not penetrate nearly as far to the south and north as WGBH-FM penetrates.

=== Cape Cod ===
During the 1990s, WBUR began expanding onto Cape Cod. In 1992, it partnered with Cape Cod Regional Technical High School to air WBUR programming over its WCCT-FM 90.3 when students were not on the air. The following year, WBUR reached similar arrangements with WSDH (91.5 FM) at Sandwich High School and WKKL (90.7 FM) at Cape Cod Community College. In 1997, auto dealer Ernie Boch Sr. donated WUOK (1240 AM) in West Yarmouth, which had been simulcasting WXTK, to Boston University, which changed its call letters to WBUR and made it a full-time satellite of WBUR-FM (which added the "-FM" suffix to accommodate the West Yarmouth station as AM stations always have the base callsign). WBUR programming was then dropped from WKKL in 1999, as the 1240 AM signal can be heard in much of WKKL's coverage area.

On November 27, 2012, WBUR announced that it would acquire WMVY (92.7 FM) in Tisbury (on Martha's Vineyard) to serve as an additional satellite, under the call letters of WBUA. The transaction was completed on February 8, 2013; at midnight that night, WBUA began to carry the WBUR schedule. WMVY's adult album alternative programming continued through an online stream and eventually they acquired a new FM facility on 88.7 and expanded it into the current incarnation of WMVY. The acquisition of WBUA rendered the 1240 AM facility redundant; on August 5, 2013, BU announced that it would be sold to Alex Langer, who would program it with Portuguese-language programming similar to that of another Langer station, WSRO. The call letters of 1240 AM were changed to WBAS on February 1, 2014, two days after BU and Langer agreed to a time brokerage agreement. Soon afterward, WSDH also dropped WBUR's programming. WBUR added another Cape Cod satellite on May 23, 2014, with the sign-on of WBUH in Brewster; this station broadcasts at a higher power than other noncommercial stations on Cape Cod, allowing it to serve the majority of the region (the exception is the Falmouth area, which is within WBUA's coverage area). BU had sought to build a station on Cape Cod since 2004 and applied for the 89.1 facility in Brewster in 2007, but in March 2011 the Federal Communications Commission issued the construction permit to Home Improvement Ministries, who subsequently sold the permit to BU. WBUR ended its agreement with WCCT-FM on September 30, 2014.

=== Rhode Island ===
In 1998, WBUR helped to found Rhode Island's NPR station WRNI. At the time, Rhode Island was one of two states lacking an NPR station. WBUR decided to partner with the newly formed Foundation for Ocean State Public Radio to build a state-of-the-art facility at historic Union Station in downtown Providence. Initially, WBUR invested heavily in WRNI's local programming, but several of these programs were soon canceled, and its schedule became almost identical to that of WBUR. In 2004, WBUR announced suddenly that it planned to drop WRNI by selling it, raising a number of questions. Rhode Islanders were angry at the thought that they would be forced to buy a station they had invested greatly in creating. It was later revealed that the WBUR management believed WRNI was a financial drain and wished to get rid of it. The resulting management turmoil caused the departure of longtime WBUR station manager Jane Christo. Eventually, the Foundation for Ocean State Public Radio, renamed Rhode Island Public Radio, bought the station in 2008; it has since rebranded as The Public's Radio and then Ocean State Media.

=== Pro-Israel boycott ===
Between 2001 and June 2002, WBUR estimated that it lost between $1–2 million due to the loss of at least six underwriters and a number of small donors. This was the result of a boycott launched by pro-Israel groups who charged that NPR coverage of the Middle East was biased against Israel. The boycott started in October 2001, when two Boston-area businesses ended contracts: WordsWorth Books (now defunct) in Cambridge, Massachusetts, and Cognex Corp. in nearby Natick, Massachusetts. The two businesses were reportedly tied with the advocacy group Committee for Accuracy in Middle East Reporting in America (CAMERA), a persistent critic of NPR's coverage for almost a decade. CAMERA has demonstrated outside National Public Radio (NPR) stations in 33 cities in the United States.

The CAMERA boycott also extended to The New York Times and The Washington Post. Fairness and Accuracy in Reporting and explicitly pro-Palestinian organizations have made contradictory accusations of pro-Israel bias in NPR's coverage or imbalance in particular stories. NPR's ombudsman and an independent reviewer appointed by the agency found "lack of completeness but strong factual accuracy and no systematic bias" in reporting on the controversial issue.

=== 2020 layoffs and cost cuts ===
In mid-June 2020, WBUR laid off 29 employees, more than 10 percent of the station's staff, and ended the Only A Game syndicated program due to the ongoing COVID-19 recession. In an email to all staff members, the station announced a spending cut of 13 percent, elimination of wage increases, a hiring freeze, and a 10 percent pay cut for Margaret Low, the current chief executive.

=== 2024 layoffs and cost cuts ===
In April 2024, CEO Margaret Low announced layoffs and buyouts amid a financial crisis. The station eliminated seven positions, and 24 employees, including four senior leadership team members, took voluntary buyouts. These cuts came as WBUR faced a $7 million decline in on-air sponsorship income and aimed to reduce its budget by $4 million. In addition to staff reductions, the station implemented cost-saving measures such as eliminating unfilled positions, reduced travel expenses, and negotiatied lower rates for contracted services.

To further save costs, Low took a ten percent pay cut as part of the cutback, Peet's coffee would no longer be purchased for the station, and cell phones would not be covered for any non-represented colleagues.

== Repeaters ==
Call sign	Frequency	City of license	First air date	ERP (W)	Height (m (ft))	Class	Facility ID	Transmitter coordinates	Call sign meaning	Former call signs	Owner
WBUH	89.1 MHz	Brewster	May 23, 2014	21,000	94 m (308 ft)	B1	173933	41°44′18.3″N 70°0′38.9″W	Derived from parent station WBUR-FM	—	Boston University
WBUA	92.7 MHz	Tisbury	June 1, 1981	3,000	96 m (315 ft)	A	7055	41°26′16.4″N 70°36′49.1″W	Derived from parent station WBUR-FM	WMVY (1981–2013)	Boston University

== See also ==
- List of NPR stations: Massachusetts
