= The Story with Dick Gordon =

Weekday interview program

The Story
- Genre: interview
- Running time: 50 minutes
- Country of origin: United States
- Language: English
- Home station: WUNC, Minnesota Public Radio
- Hosted by: Dick Gordon
- Recording studio: Chapel Hill, North Carolina
- Original release: 2006 – 2013
- Opening theme: Santoro by Corey Harris
- Website: TheStory.org
- Podcast: The Story podcast

The Story with Dick Gordon was a weekday interview program hosted by Dick Gordon, former host of WBUR's The Connection and, before that, fill-in host for the Canadian Broadcasting Corporation's national radio program This Morning. Produced by North Carolina Public Radio and Minnesota Public Radio and distributed by American Public Media, the show was based largely on stories and interviews chosen by listener input, though it was not a call-in show.

Debuting in February 2006, the program originally was broadcast five times a week on North Carolina Public Radio and Minnesota Public Radio (American Public Media's main subsidiary). The program was rolled out nationally in early 2007.

Dick Gordon decided to end the show in October 2013 (last show on the 11th), so that he could return to Canada to be closer to family.

The show's theme song was an excerpt from the song "Santoro", by Corey Harris, from his album Downhome Sophisticate.
