= WUNC (FM) =

Public radio station in Chapel Hill, North Carolina

- Chapel Hill, North Carolina; United States
- Broadcast area: Research Triangle and eastern North Carolina
- Frequency: 91.5 MHz (HD Radio)

Programming
- Format: Public radio (news, information, specialty music)
- Subchannels: HD2: BBC World Service
- Affiliations: National Public Radio; Public Radio Exchange; American Public Media; BBC World Service

Ownership
- Owner: University of North Carolina at Chapel Hill; (WUNC Public Radio, LLC)

History
- First air date: April 3, 1976
- Call sign meaning: University of North Carolina

Technical information
- Licensing authority: FCC
- Facility ID: 66581
- Class: C
- ERP: 100,000 watts
- HAAT: 415 meters (1,362 ft)

Links
- Public license information: Public file; LMS
- Webcast: Listen live
- Website: www.wunc.org

WUNC (91.5 MHz) is a listener-supported public radio station, serving the Research Triangle area of North Carolina. It is licensed to Chapel Hill and is operated by the University of North Carolina at Chapel Hill (UNC). On weekdays, WUNC carries National Public Radio, American Public Media, Public Radio Exchange, and BBC programming in an "all-news-and-information" format, including shows such as All Things Considered, Morning Edition and Fresh Air. On weekends, in addition to NPR weekend shows, WUNC broadcasts locally produced folk music programming. The longest-running continuously produced program offered by the station is Back Porch Music, a weekly folk and traditional music program. WUNC holds periodic on-air fundraisers seeking listener contributions.

The station operates six full-service FM repeater stations, WFSS from Fayetteville on 91.9; WRQM from Rocky Mount on 90.9; WBUX from Buxton on 90.5; WUND-FM from Columbia on 88.9; WUNL-FM from Laurinburg on 89.1; WUNW-FM from Welcome on 91.1; and WZCO from Chadbourn on 89.9. WUNC should not be confused with WXYC, which is UNC's student radio station.

As of May 2026, WUNC has the highest ratings of any station in the Raleigh–Durham radio market.

== History ==
WUNC was originally on the air for a brief time as an AM station in the 1940s, then returned to the air on October 29, 1952, as a student-run FM station with equipment from Jefferson Standard Broadcasting, which had operated WBT-FM for several years. The original station stayed on the air until a lightning strike in 1970.

WUNC signed on in its current incarnation on April 3, 1976. It immediately became the state's second NPR member. One of its earliest shows was Gary Shivers on Jazz, a jazz program produced by the station and syndicated regionally. (Shivers was the station's first program director and second general manager.) WUNC had studios in Swain Hall on the University of North Carolina at Chapel Hill campus; it moved to a state-of-the-art studio near the Friday Center in 1999. Prior to its switch to a news and information format, the station was a multi-format station of NPR news, classical music, and jazz music.

WRQM began in 1992 as a separate NPR station under the call sign WESQ, licensed to North Carolina Wesleyan College in Rocky Mount. NCWC set up the station to fill the void left by the closure of WVSP, an African-American public radio station licensed to Warrenton but which moved to Rocky Mount in 1985, shortly before it closed. WESQ offered a variety of music that included country and R&B. When Wesleyan opted to cut ties with the station in 1995, a group of Rocky Mount business leaders known as Friends of Down East Public Radio bought the station and relaunched it as WRQM on March 31, 1996. The station floundered for most of its existence, as there were just barely enough listeners in that area of the market for the station to be viable on its own. This caused a chronic shortage of financial support. In March 1999, it began airing most of WUNC's schedule; it became a full repeater of WUNC that October.

WUND-FM in Columbia signed on March 24, 1999, bringing NPR programming to one of the few areas of North Carolina without a clear signal from a full-fledged NPR station.

WUNW-FM in Welcome signed on as a full-service FM station on 91.1 FM in December 2013, providing increased coverage of WUNC to suburban communities in Davidson County, located south of Greensboro and Winston-Salem.

On May 13, 2015, officials announced the acquisition of WFSS, a public radio station licensed to Fayetteville State University in Fayetteville. Simulcasting of WUNC began at 10 a.m. on May 13, 2015. The sale closed in November.

On August 4, 2016, WUNC launched WUNC Music, an adult album alternative format, on its HD2 channel and on its website. WUNC shut down WUNC Music on June 30, 2024.

On May 31, 2023, WUNC announced the purchase of WZCO in Chadbourn, the former Columbus County Schools student-run radio station, for $50,000. WUNC programming began on October 6.

In June 2025, WUNC finished building and signed on a new station, WUNL-FM, licensed to Laurinburg. WUNL-FM covers parts of Richmond, Robeson and Scotland counties along the South Carolina border; this area previously had no access to a local-grade NPR signal except for a translator of WFAE that covers Laurinburg proper.

== Programming ==
Aside from Back Porch Music, WUNC also produces The People's Pharmacy with Joe and Terry Graedon, a nationally syndicated program first broadcast on WUNC in the early 1980s. From 1999 to 2020, it also aired The State of Things, a regionally syndicated local affairs show. The network began offering podcasts for The State of Things and other locally produced news stories in September 2005.

WUNC's main radio studios are located in Chapel Hill near the Friday Center. In 2005, a second broadcast facility was opened in Durham's American Tobacco Historic District. On October 17, 2005, The State of Things began production at the new Durham location and broadcasts live about once a month remotely from Triad Stage in Greensboro. Other programs continue production in the Chapel Hill studios.

Dick Gordon, former host of WBUR's The Connection, began hosting a new interview show called The Story with Dick Gordon on February 16, 2006, that was co-produced with and nationally syndicated by American Public Media. The show's final program aired on WUNC on October 11, 2013. Talk of the Nation had been dropped by WUNC-FM earlier in the year. Today, in addition to the aforementioned current programs plus NPR staples such as Morning Edition, All Things Considered, Fresh Air with Terry Gross and Wait Wait... Don't Tell Me!, WUNC-FM also airs 1A, The Takeaway, It's Been A Minute and Here and Now. Many of these shows are distributed nationally by American Public Media, Public Radio Exchange, or WNYC.

WUNC is the home station of the American Homefront Project, which reports on military life and veterans issues.

=== HD programming ===
WUNC broadcasts in the HD radio format. From August 2016 through June 2024, WUNC aired WUNC Music on its HD2 digital subchannel. WUNC Music specialized in adult album alternative (AAA), indie rock, Americana, and music by North Carolina artists.

Effective July 1, 2024, WUNC-HD2 began carrying programming from BBC World Service.

== Transmitters ==
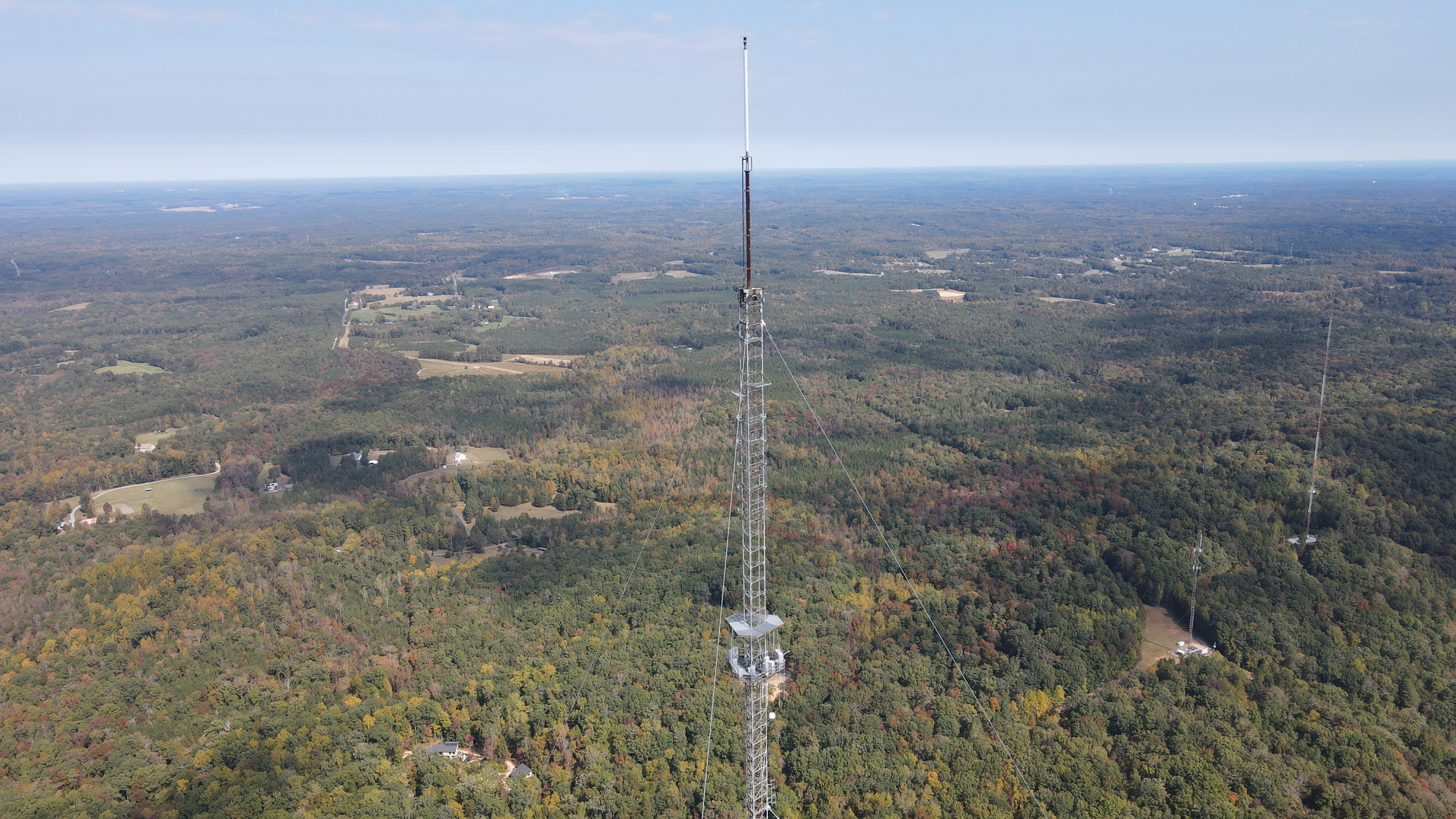
WUNC-FM and WUNC-TV transmitting mast near Pittsboro

In 2005, to reflect its growth into a network, WUNC rebranded as "North Carolina Public Radio - WUNC". The call signs of the other stations are identified only during required station identifications at the start of each hour. However, in recent years, it has largely reverted to using "WUNC" as its main on-air name, with "North Carolina Public Radio" as a secondary brand.

WUNC's 100,000-watt signal broadcasts from the PBS North Carolina tower on Terrells Mountain in Chatham County, five miles west of Chapel Hill. In addition to its home market of the Research Triangle (Raleigh, Durham and Chapel Hill), it also provides a strong city-grade signal to the eastern Piedmont Triad, including Greensboro and High Point. Terrells Mountain is roughly halfway between the Triangle and the Triad, and WUNC has long claimed Greensboro as part of its primary coverage area. WUNC provides much of the eastern Triad region a second choice for NPR programming alongside that market's primary NPR station, WFDD in Winston-Salem.

WRQM serves the far eastern portion of the Triangle market, as well as Greenville. WUND serves northeastern North Carolina and the Outer Banks, with WBUX covering southern Dare County. WUNW covers portions of Davidson County that aren't served by WUNC's main signal. WFSS is heard in the Fayetteville area. WZCO serves the largely rural area between Fayetteville and Wilmington. WUNL-FM covers Scotland County and the surrounding area. Combined, the seven stations reach just over half of North Carolina's population, providing at least secondary coverage from the fringes of the Charlotte suburbs to the Outer Banks.

Call sign	Frequency	City of license	Facility ID	Class	ERP (W)	Transmitter coordinates
WBUX	90.5 FM	Buxton, North Carolina	91800	A	5,900	35°15′41.5″N 75°34′17.5″W
WUNC	91.5 FM (HD)	Chapel Hill, North Carolina	66581	C	100,000	35°51′59.5″N 79°9′59″W
WUND-FM	88.9 FM	Manteo, North Carolina	89274	C0	50,000	35°54′0.6″N 76°20′43.8″W
WFSS	91.9 FM (HD)	Fayetteville, North Carolina	21241	C1	100,000	35°4′22.6″N 78°53′26.1″W
WRQM	90.9 FM (HD)	Rocky Mount, North Carolina	49158	C2	7,500	35°48′40.6″N 77°44′31.9″W
WUNL-FM	89.1 FM	Laurinburg, North Carolina	768742	C3	10,500	34°41′42″N 79°26′43″W
WUNW-FM	91.1 FM	Welcome, North Carolina	172306	A	180	35°53′11.5″N 80°12′4.2″W
WZCO	89.9 FM	Chadbourn, North Carolina	175138	C2	25,000	34°32′17.6″N 78°42′35.1″W

=== Translators ===
Broadcast translator for WUNC
Call sign	Frequency	City of license	FID	ERP (W)	Class	Transmitter coordinates	FCC info
W260CU	99.9 FM	Southern Pines, North Carolina	147236	10	D	35°10′35.6″N 79°24′52.1″W	LMS
