= Dave Staton =

American baseball player (born 1968)

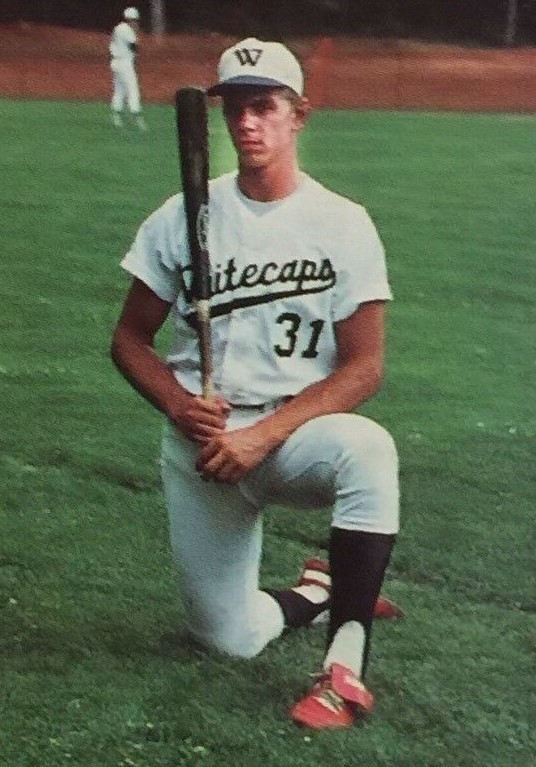
- First baseman
- Born: April 12, 1968 (age 58); Seattle, Washington
- Batted: Right Threw: Right

MLB debut
- September 8, 1993, for the San Diego Padres

Last MLB appearance
- May 19, 1994, for the San Diego Padres

MLB statistics
- Batting average: .213
- Home runs: 9
- Runs batted in: 15
- Stats at Baseball Reference

Teams
- San Diego Padres (1993–1994)

David Alan Staton (born April 12, 1968) is an American former Major League Baseball first baseman. He played for the San Diego Padres from 1993 to 1994.

== Amateur career ==
A native of Seattle, Washington, Staton graduated from Tustin High School, and played college baseball for Orange Coast College and California State Fullerton. In 1988, Staton played collegiate summer baseball for the Brewster Whitecaps of the Cape Cod Baseball League (CCBL). He was named league MVP for Brewster, leading the league in home runs in a year when the league featured future major league sluggers Frank Thomas and Mo Vaughn. Staton was inducted into the CCBL Hall of Fame in 2004.

Staton was selected in the 5th round of the 1989 MLB draft by the Padres.

== Professional career ==
Staton began his professional career playing for the Spokane Indians in 1989. The following season, he played for the Riverside Red Wave and the Wichita Wranglers. In 1991, he was promoted to the Padres' Triple A affiliate Las Vegas Stars, and played there again in 1992.

Staton made his Major League debut for San Diego on September 8, 1993, in a 3–2 home win over the Florida Marlins. In that game, he had three at bats but no hits and two strikeouts. Staton appeared in 17 games for San Diego that season, was at bat 42 times, and had 11 hits, 7 runs, and 5 home runs. In the 1994 season, he played in 29 games for the Padres, was at bat 66 times, had 12 hits, 6 runs, and 4 home runs. His final major league game was played on May 19, 1994, in a 9–5 loss to the Houston Astros. During his time with the Padres, Staton wore the number 31 jersey.

After the 1994 season, he was selected by the Los Angeles Dodgers in the 1994 Rule 5 draft, but spent the 1995 season with the New Orleans Zephyrs of the American Association, and was not called up to the major league level.
