= Pat Shine =

Pat Shine is an American minor league baseball manager and former Major League coach. In 2017, he managed the Clinton LumberKings, Class A affiliate of the Seattle Mariners until June 2017. He is a former member of the coaching staff of MLB's Miami Marlins, and pitched to Giancarlo Stanton in the 2016 Major League Baseball Home Run Derby, which Stanton won.

== Baseball career ==
Shine attended Gonzaga Preparatory School and Gonzaga University, where he played college baseball for the Gonzaga Bulldogs and the Whitworth Pirates. He became friends with Mike Redmond, his teammate in high school and college.

Shine coached the St. Cloud River Bats of the collegiate summer baseball Northwoods League in 1998, and took over as the team's manager in 1999. In 2000, he was pitching coach for the Brewster Whitecaps of the Cape Cod Baseball League, but took over as interim manager and led the team to the league title.

He joined the UC Irvine Anteaters baseball team as an assistant coach in 2002, serving through 2013. He has also coached for the baseball teams at the University of California, Los Angeles and Cal State Los Angeles. In 2014, he joined the Miami Marlins' major league coaching staff under Mike Redmond, focusing on instant replay.
