= Nick Dunn =

American baseball player (born 1997)

York Revolution – No. 9
- Second baseman
- Born: January 29, 1997 (age 29); Sunbury, Pennsylvania, U.S.
- Bats: Left Throws: Right
- Stats at Baseball Reference

Nicholas Dunn (born January 29, 1997) is an American professional baseball second baseman for the York Revolution of the Atlantic League of Professional Baseball.

== Amateur career ==
Dunn attended Shikellamy High School in Sunbury, Pennsylvania. In 2015, as a senior, he batted .477 with seven home runs and 32 RBI. After graduating, he spent the summer playing in the Cal Ripken Collegiate Baseball League for the Silver Spring–Takoma Thunderbolts.

Dunn played college baseball at the University of Maryland. In 2016 and 2017, he played collegiate summer baseball for the Brewster Whitecaps of the Cape Cod Baseball League, where he was named a league all-star in 2016, and won the league's playoff MVP award in 2017. As a senior in 2018, he hit .330 with ten home runs and 39 RBI and was named a second-team All-American.

== Professional career ==
=== St. Louis Cardinals ===
Dunn was selected by the St. Louis Cardinals in the fifth round (153rd overall) of the 2018 Major League Baseball draft.

Dunn made his professional debut in 2018 State College Spikes and also played for the Peoria Chiefs, batting .253 with three home runs and 35 RBI over 65 games. In 2019, he played with Peoria, hitting .247 with three home runs and 38 RBI over 104 games. Dunn did not play in a game in 2020 due to the cancellation of the minor league season because of the COVID-19 pandemic.

In 2021, Dunn played for the Double-A Springfield Cardinals and hit .259 with six home runs and 36 RBI over 95 games; he returned to Springfield in 2022, hitting .271 with seven home runs and 44 RBI across 112 appearances. Dunn opened the 2023 season with Springfield. In late July, he was promoted to the Triple-A Memphis Redbirds. Over 124 appearances between the two affiliates, he slashed .319/.413/.442 with nine home runs, sixty RBI, and 25 doubles.

=== Seattle Mariners ===
On October 15, 2024, Dunn signed a minor league contract with the Seattle Mariners. Dunn began the 2025 season with the Triple-A Tacoma Rainiers, hitting .184/.250/.255 with one home run, 11 RBI, and one stolen base.

=== Philadelphia Phillies ===
On June 14, 2025, Dunn was traded to the Philadelphia Phillies in exchange for cash; he was subsequently assigned to the Double-A Reading Fightin Phils, where he batted .225 with seven home runs, 25 RBI, and two stolen bases in 43 games. He also made 10 appearances for the Triple-A Lehigh Valley IronPigs, going 9-for-34 (.265) with one home run and three RBI. Dunn elected free agency following the season on November 6.

=== York Revolution ===
On April 8, 2026, Dunn signed with the York Revolution of the Atlantic League of Professional Baseball.
