= Brendan Lawson =

Florida Gator baseball player

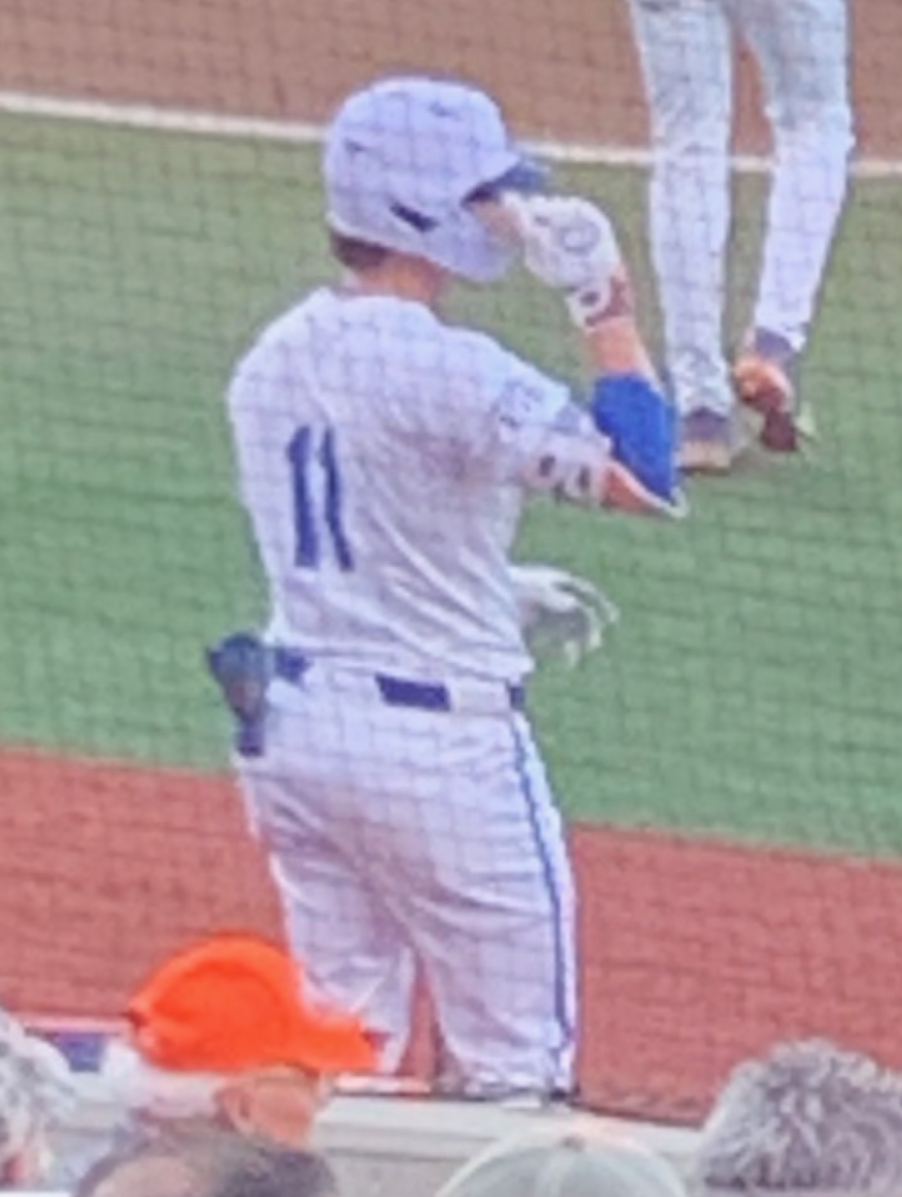

Florida Gators – No. 11
- Shortstop
- Born: December 7, 2005 (age 20); Toronto, Ontario, Canada
- Bats: Left Throws: Right
- Stats at Baseball Reference

Career highlights and awards
- First-team Freshman All-American (2025); SEC All-Freshman Team (2025)

Brendan John Lawson (born December 7, 2005) is a Canadian college baseball shortstop for the Florida Gators.

== Early life ==
Lawson was born in Toronto, Canada. Although he played hockey frequently throughout his youth, he ultimately chose to pursue a career in baseball. He played for various travel teams and the Canadian Junior National Team. He was part of the Ontario team that won the gold medal at the 2022 Canada Summer Games.

Lawson attended P27 Baseball Academy in Lexington, South Carolina. After arriving, he suffered a serious sinus infection that sidelined him for some time. He competed in the MLB Draft League in 2024, playing 10 games for the Trenton Thunder. He would be drafted by the St. Louis Cardinals in the 19th round of the 2024 MLB draft. He did not sign and chose to play college baseball, signing with the Florida Gators.

== College career ==
Although Lawson had primarily played shortstop during his prep career, he was utilized as a first baseman by Florida in 2025. After the Gators suffered numerous injuries to key players, Lawson would additionally play second and third base. In his first season, Lawson would play 60 total games and record a slash line of .317/.417/.522. He also became only the third Gator to ever record a 5-hit game in the NCAA Tournament, going 5-for-7 with three RBI and three runs scored against Fairfield. In 2025, he played collegiate summer baseball with the Brewster Whitecaps of the Cape Cod Baseball League, and was named a league all-star.

Ahead of the 2026 season, Lawson was named the top prospect for the 2027 MLB draft by Baseball America. He returned to playing shortstop as Florida's opening day starter at the position.
