= Bill Mosiello =

American college baseball coach

Biographical details
- Born: July 14, 1964 (age 62); Sacramento, California, U.S.
- Education: Fresno State University

Playing career
- 1983, 1986: Fresno State
- 1984–1985: Cerritos College
- Position: Catcher

Coaching career (HC unless noted)
- 1987–1990: Cerritos College (H)
- 1991–1992: Cal State Fullerton (H)
- 1993–1994: Tennessee (H)
- 1995: Ole Miss (P)
- 1996–2001: Oklahoma (H/IF/AHC)
- 2001: Arizona State (H)
- 2002–2003: Trenton Thunder (H)
- 2004: Battle Creek Yankees (H/Interim)
- 2005–2006: Charleston RiverDogs
- 2007: USC (H)
- 2008: Auburn (H)
- 2009–2010: Cedar Rapids Kernels
- 2011: Arkansas Travelers
- 2012–2013: Tennessee (H)
- 2014–2022: TCU (H/AHC)
- 2023–2024: Ohio State
- 2025–2026: TCU (H/AHC)

Head coaching record
- Overall: 60–51 (.541)

William Mosiello (born July 14, 1964) is an American baseball coach and former catcher, who was most recently an assistant baseball coach for the TCU Horned Frogs. He has also served as head coach for the Ohio State Buckeyes. He played college baseball at Cerritos College from 1984 to 1985 before transferring to Fresno State where he played in 1986.

== Playing career ==
Mosiello went to Cerritos High School in Cerritos, California, where he played catcher. Mosiello redshirted the 1983 season at Fresno State. He then transferred and played at Cerritos College. As a Freshman, Mosiello was named the most inspirational player for the Falcons. He was named second team All-South Coast Conference as a sophomore. Mosiello then returned to Fresno State, where he lettered in 1986.

== Coaching career ==
Mosiello began his coaching career in 1987, returning to Cerritos as their hitting coach. He would join the staff at Cal State Fullerton from 1991 to 1992. 1993, saw him take the hitting coach position with the Tennessee Volunteers. Mosiello skippered the Brewster Whitecaps, a collegiate summer baseball team in the Cape Cod Baseball League, in 1994 and from 1996 to 1999, and was named the league's manager of the year in 1998.

While an assistant coach at Oklahoma, Mosiello abruptly quit 23 games into the 2001 season after being told to temper his intensity.

In 2004, Mosiello was manager of the Battle Creek Yankees. The Yankees moved him to the Charleston RiverDogs in 2005, where the RiverDogs best first half record allowed him to manage the South Atlantic League's South Division All Stars.

Mosiello joined Chad Kreuter's staff as the hitting coach of the USC Trojans in 2007. After a single season, he left the Trojans to join the Auburn Tigers.

While managing the Arkansas Travelers during the 2011 season, Mosiello abruptly resigned to return to the college game, as well as Tennessee in 2011, as the team's hitting coach.

In the summer of 2013, Mosiello joined Jim Schlossnagle's staff at TCU. His longest coaching stay came at TCU, where he helped lead the Horned Frogs to seven NCAA tournaments and four College World Series from 2014 to 2022.

On June 16, 2022, Mosiello was named the head coach at Ohio State, his first head coaching position at the Division I level in his lengthy coaching career.

== Head coaching record ==
Record table
Season	Team	Overall	Conference	Standing	Postseason
Ohio State Buckeyes (Big Ten Conference) (2023–2024)
2023	Ohio State	31–25	9–15	11th	
2024	Ohio State	29–26	12–12	T–7th	Big Ten Tournament
Ohio State:		60–51 (.541)	21–27 (.438)		
Total:		60–51 (.541)			
National champion Postseason invitational champion Conference regular season champion Conference regular season and conference tournament champion Division regular season champion Division regular season and conference tournament champion Conference tournament champion

== Personal life ==
Mosiello and his wife, Janelle, have three sons: Shane, Gehrig and Helton. His son Shane is an ICU registered nurse.
