= Stony Brook Field =

Baseball venue in Brewster, Massachusetts

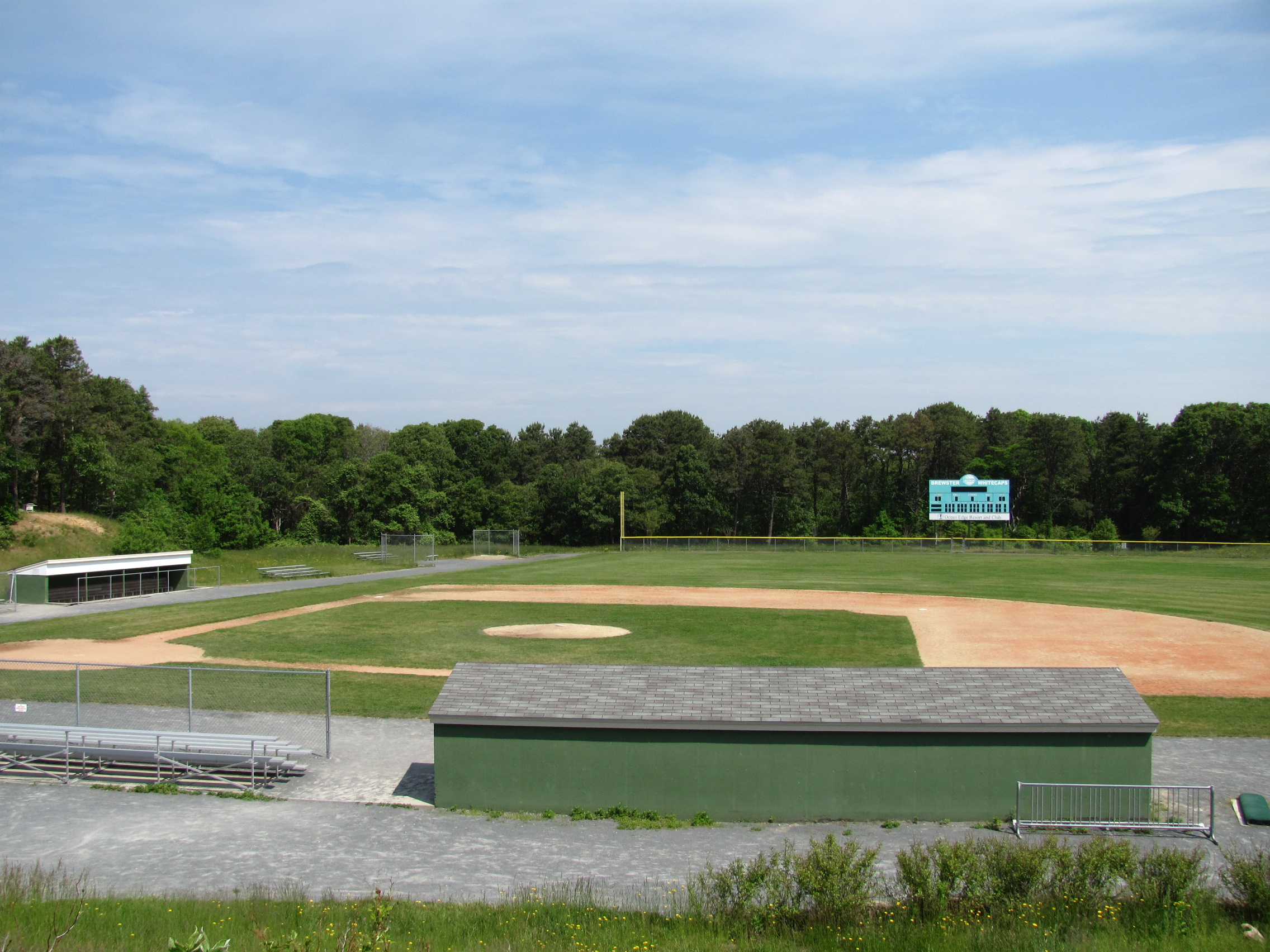
- Stony Brook Field
- Interactive map of Stony Brook Field
- Full name: Stony Brook Field
- Address: 384 Underpass Road
- Location: Brewster, Massachusetts
- Coordinates: 41.75813°N 70.0702°W
- Capacity: 4,000
- Surface: Grass
- Field size: Left Field: 325 ft Center Field: 375 ft Right Field: 325 ft

Construction
- Opened: 2006

Tenant
- Brewster Whitecaps

Stony Brook Field is a baseball venue in Brewster, Massachusetts, home to the Brewster Whitecaps of the Cape Cod Baseball League (CCBL). The ballpark is located adjacent to Stony Brook Elementary School along Underpass Road. Stony Brook is one of three CCBL ballparks that does not have lights.

Opened in 2006, Stony Brook is ringed by trees on three sides and intersects with the Cape Cod Rail Trail. With a capacity of over four thousand, the park features small rows of bleachers along both sides of the infield, along with picnic seating and several grassy areas around the infield and outfield for fans on blankets and beach chairs. A large playground with overhead netting is situated behind the home plate pressbox.

The Whitecaps joined the CCBL in 1988 and, without a suitable venue in town, played their home games at Cape Cod Regional Technical High School in neighboring Harwich. The use of Cape Cod Tech was intended to be short-term but continued through 2005. Stony Brook Field was constructed thanks to a sizeable grant from the Yawkey Foundation, matched with support from the team raised through voluntary donations and gifts of time and services. The new ballpark allowed the team to move "home" to Brewster, where it would now be able to have a more visible presence in the town and thereby promote greater local interest.

Stony Brook Field saw the Whitecaps capture their second and third CCBL championship crowns as a capacity crowd watched the 2017 team win the decisive third game of the title series over the Bourne Braves, and the 2021 team again bested Bourne in the finals. The ballpark has been the summertime home of many future major leaguers such as Kyle Hendricks, Jeff McNeil, and Aaron Judge.

== See also ==
- Cape Cod Baseball League
- Brewster Whitecaps
