= Brian Fitzpatrick (baseball) =

American baseball player (born 2000)

- Fitzpatrick pitching against the Colorado Rockies on June 5, 2026

Milwaukee Brewers – No. 35
- Pitcher
- Born: June 1, 2000 (age 26); Smithtown, New York, U.S.
- Bats: Both Throws: Left

MLB debut
- April 29, 2026, for the Milwaukee Brewers

MLB statistics (through 2026 season)
- Win–loss record: 0–0
- Earned run average: 1.35
- Strikeouts: 5
- Stats at Baseball Reference

Teams
- Milwaukee Brewers (2026–present)

Brian Paul Fitzpatrick (born June 1, 2000) is an American professional baseball pitcher for the Milwaukee Brewers of Major League Baseball (MLB). He played college baseball for the Rutgers Scarlet Knights and was drafted by the Brewers in the 10th round of the 2022 MLB Draft. He made his MLB debut in 2026.

== Amateur career ==
Fitzpatrick attended St. Anthony's High School in South Huntington, New York, and Rutgers University, where he played college baseball for the Scarlet Knights. In 2021 and 2022, he played collegiate summer baseball with the Brewster Whitecaps of the Cape Cod Baseball League. The Milwaukee Brewers selected him in the 10th round, with the 312th overall selection, of the 2022 Major League Baseball draft.

== Professional career ==
Fitzpatrick made his professional debut in 2022 with the rookie-level Arizona Complex League Brewers, recording a 2.45 ERA over two appearances. He split the 2023 campaign between the ACL Brewers and Single-A Carolina Mudcats, accumulating a 1-2 record and 6.46 ERA with 33 strikeouts across 11 appearances (including seven starts). He made 20 appearances (seven starts) for the High-A Wisconsin Timber Rattlers in 2024, compiling a 5-2 record and 2.69 ERA with 76 strikeouts and one save across 70 1/3 innings pitched.

Fitzpatrick split the 2025 season between the Triple-A Nashville Sounds, Double-A Biloxi Shuckers, and Wisconsin. In 38 appearances out of the bullpen for the three affiliates, he posted a cumulative 5-4 record and 3.59 ERA with 62 strikeouts and two saves over 57 2/3 innings pitched. Fitzpatrick began the 2026 season with Triple-A Nashville, tossing 10 1/3 scoreless innings with 11 strikeouts over his first ten outings of the year.

On April 29, 2026, Fitzpatrick was selected to the 40-man roster and promoted to the major leagues for the first time. He made five appearances for Milwaukee, recording a 1.35 ERA with five strikeouts across 6 2/3 innings pitched. On June 9, Fitzpatrick was placed on the 60-day injured list after being diagnosed with a partial UCL sprain. On July 5, it was announced that Fitzpatrick had undergone Tommy John surgery, ending his season.
