= Tyler Gentry =

American baseball player (born 1999)

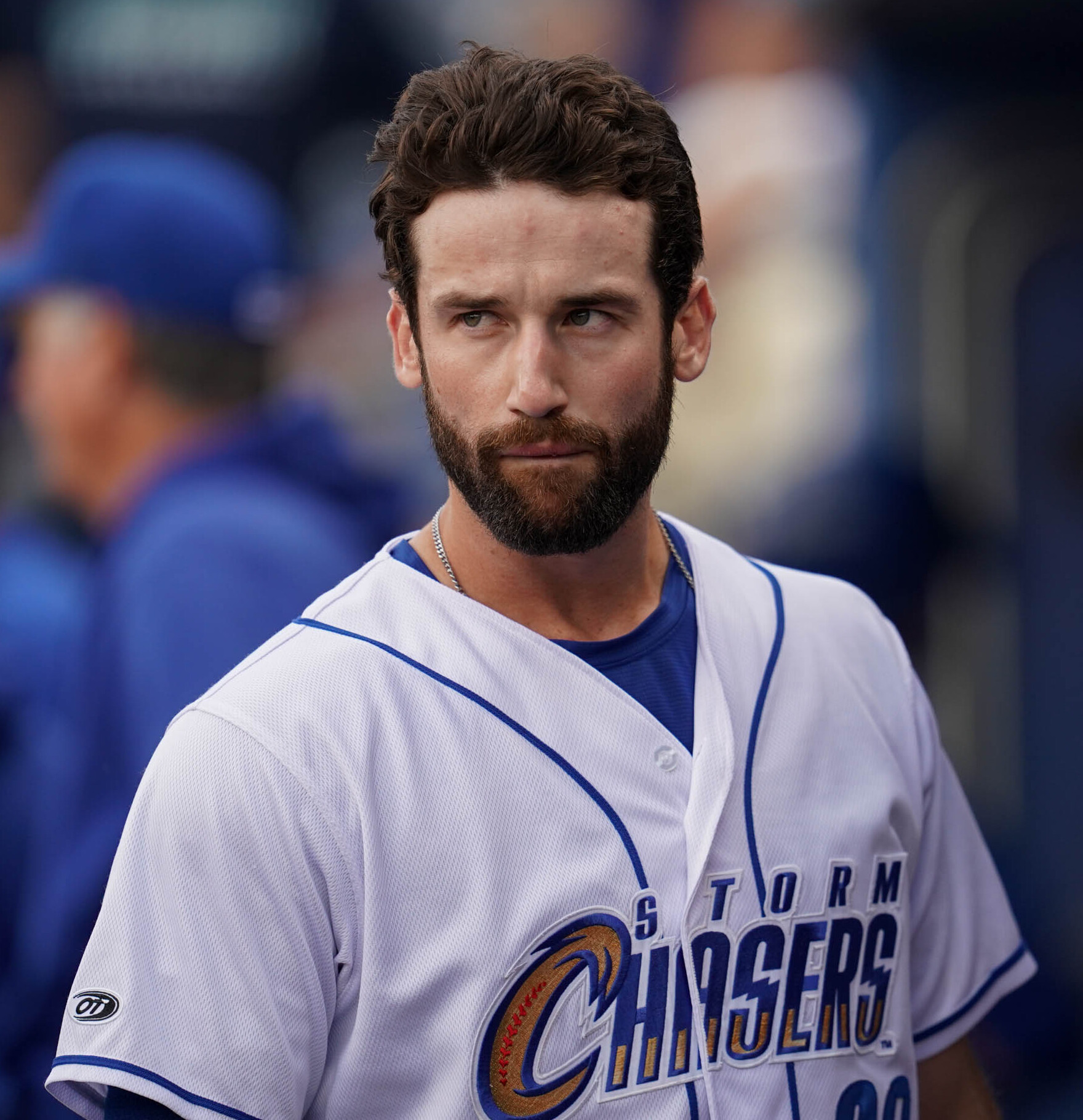
- Gentry with the Omaha Storm Chasers in 2024

Kansas City Monarchs – No. 3
- Outfielder
- Born: February 1, 1999 (age 27); Memphis, Tennessee, U.S.
- Bats: Right Throws: Right

MLB debut
- August 25, 2024, for the Kansas City Royals

MLB statistics (through 2024 season)
- Batting average: .000
- Home runs: 0
- Runs batted in: 0
- Stats at Baseball Reference

Teams
- Kansas City Royals (2024)

Tyler Jackson Gentry (born February 1, 1999) is an American professional baseball outfielder for the Kansas City Monarchs of the American Association of Professional Baseball. He has previously played in Major League Baseball (MLB) for the Kansas City Royals.

== Amateur career ==
Gentry attended Arlington High School in Arlington, Tennessee, where he played baseball. As a junior in 2016, he batted .341 with 33 RBIs. As a senior in 2017, he earned all-state honors. He went unselected in the 2017 Major League Baseball draft, and enrolled at Walters State Community College where he played one season of college baseball.

During Gentry's first and only season at Walters State in 2018, he batted .379 with 18 home runs over 64 games. Following the season's end, he transferred to the University of Alabama where he played for the Alabama Crimson Tide baseball team. Over 56 games in 2019 with the Crimson Tide, Gentry hit .310 with a team-high 13 home runs, 42 RBIs, and 37 runs scored. That summer, he played in the Cape Cod Baseball League with the Brewster Whitecaps where he was named a league all-star. During his junior season in 2020, he batted .429 over 17 games before the season was cancelled due to the COVID-19 pandemic.

== Professional career ==
=== Kansas City Royals ===
Gentry was selected by the Kansas City Royals in the third round with the 76th overall selection of the 2020 Major League Baseball draft. He signed for $750,000. Gentry did not play in a game in 2020 due to the cancellation of the minor league season because of the COVID-19 pandemic. Gentry made his professional debut in 2021 with the High–A Quad Cities River Bandits. His season ended in mid-July due to knee injuries. Over 44 games prior to the injury, he batted .259 with six home runs and 28 RBI. Gentry opened the 2022 season with Quad Cities and was promoted to the Double–A Northwest Arkansas Naturals in early June. Over 108 games between the two teams, he slashed .326/.422/.542 with 21 home runs, 86 RBI, 22 doubles, and 10 stolen bases. He was selected to play in the Arizona Fall League for the Surprise Saguaros after the season. Gentry was assigned to the Omaha Storm Chasers of the Triple–A International League for the 2023 season. Over 129 games, he batted .253 with 16 home runs, 71 RBI, and 28 doubles.

On November 14, 2023, the Royals added Gentry to their 40-man roster to protect him from the Rule 5 draft. He was optioned to Triple–A Omaha to begin the 2024 season. In 105 games for Omaha, Gentry hit .256/.346/.429 with 13 home runs and 54 RBI. On August 25, 2024, Gentry was selected to the 40-man roster and promoted to the major leagues for the first time. He made his debut later that day in an 11–3 Royals loss to the Philadelphia Phillies, coming in to pinch-hit for MJ Melendez in the bottom of the eighth inning. Facing José Alvarado, Gentry swung at the first pitch and flew out to right fielder Nick Castellanos. Gentry finished the game in right field.

Gentry was optioned to Triple-A Omaha to begin the 2025 season, where he batted .205/.277/.365 with five home runs, 24 RBI, and three stolen bases. Gentry was designated for assignment by Kansas City on July 22, 2025. He cleared waivers and was sent outright to Triple-A Omaha on July 27.

On March 24, 2026, Gentry was released by the Royals organization.

=== Detroit Tigers ===
On April 11, 2026, the Detroit Tigers signed Gentry to a minor league contract. He was subsequently assigned to Triple-A Toledo Mud Hens. He played in 71 games for Toledo and hit .250 with nine home runs and 48 RBI. On August 10, the Tigers released Gentry from his minor league contract.

=== Kansas City Monarchs ===
On August 14, 2026, Gentry signed with the Kansas City Monarchs of the American Association of Professional Baseball.
