= Ryder Helfrick =

American baseball player (born 2005)

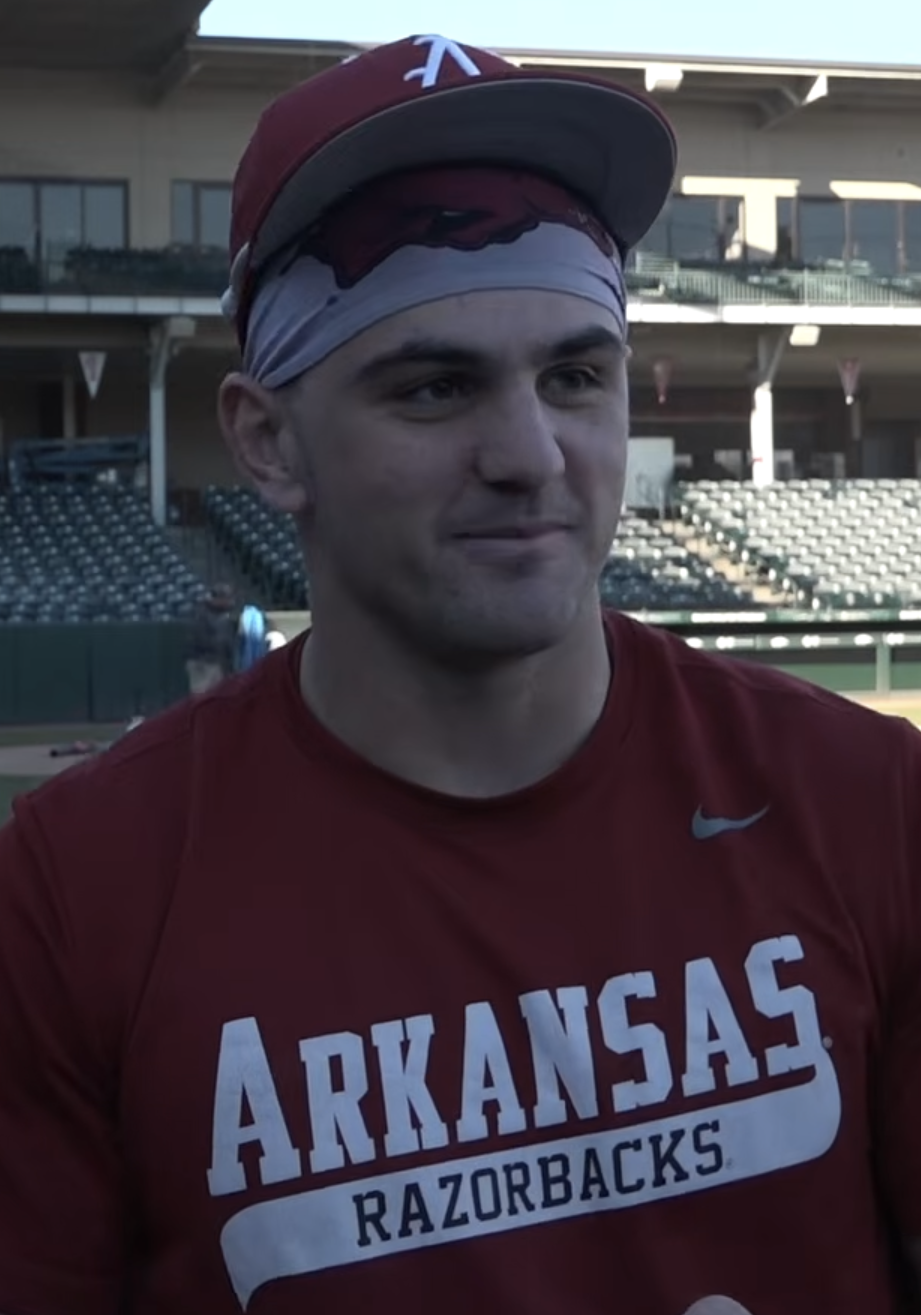
- Helfrick in 2026

Arizona Diamondbacks
- Catcher
- Born: February 17, 2005 (age 21); Livermore, California, U.S.
- Bats: Right Throws: Right
- Stats at Baseball Reference

Ryder Patrick Helfrick (born February 17, 2005) is an American professional baseball catcher in the Arizona Diamondbacks organization.

== Amateur career ==
Helfrick attended Clayton Valley Charter High School in Concord, California. He was named the MVP of the 2022 Perfect Game All-American Classic. He committed to the University of Arkansas to play college baseball.

As a freshman at Arkansas in 2024, Helfrick played in 31 games with 26 starts and hit .179/.320/.321 with three home runs and eight runs batted in (RBI) over 84 at-bats. After the season he played summer ball for the Brewster Whitecaps in the Cape Cod League. As a sophomore in 2025, he started 56 of 61 games, hitting .305/.420/.616 with 15 home runs and 38 RBI over 190 at-bats.

Helfrick returned as Arkansas' starting catcher his junior year in 2026. He played in a total of 62 games and hit .283 with 18 home runs and 53 RBI.

== Professional career ==
Helfrick was considered a top prospect for the 2026 Major League Baseball draft. He was selected by the Arizona Diamondbacks in the first round with the 15th overall pick. He signed for a $5.2 million signing bonus.
