= Brewster Whitecaps =

Collegiate summer baseball team in Massachusetts

- Logo

Information
- League: Cape Cod Baseball League (East Division)
- Location: Brewster, Massachusetts
- Ballpark: Stony Brook Field
- Founded: 1988
- League championships: 2000, 2017, 2021
- Former ballpark: Cape Cod Tech (1988–2005)
- President: Chris Kenney
- General manager: Ned Monthie
- Manager: Jamie Shevchik
- Website: www.capecodleague.com/brewster/

The Brewster Whitecaps are a collegiate summer baseball team based in Brewster, Massachusetts. The team is a member of the Cape Cod Baseball League (CCBL) and plays in the league's East Division. The Whitecaps play their home games at Stony Brook Field on the campus of Stony Brook Elementary School in Brewster.

The Whitecaps most recently won the CCBL championship in 2021 when they defeated the Bourne Braves two games to none to win the best of three championship series. The title was the third in team history, having won previously in 2000 and 2017. Since the club's inception, over 100 players have gone on to play in Major League Baseball.

== History ==
=== Pre-modern era ===
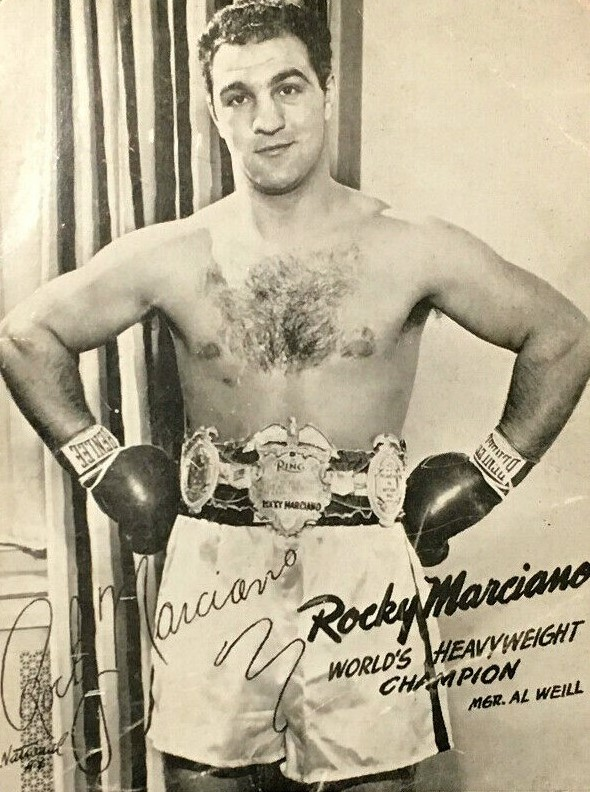
Rocky Marciano was a fan of the Brewster town team in 1958.

==== Early years ====
Organized baseball in the town of Brewster, Massachusetts dates to the late 1800s. In 1886, the Brewster town team defeated the "Yarmouth Grays", 11–9, in a July 3 contest that featured a rare triple play turned by Brewster. The Brewster squad, reportedly bolstered by collegiate talent, had earlier swept a home-and-home series against Harwich.

In the 1910s, the Brewster chapter of the Improved Order of Red Men sponsored a baseball team known as the "Red Tops", a club that was "an aggregation of young college men." The Red Tops played a series of three games against their counterparts from East Dennis in 1911 that attracted large crowds. In 1915 and 1916, the Red Tops were captained by Dartmouth College's Albert F. Rice, and the team's annual contest against the Brewster town team was a main attraction at the Brewster Grange fair.

==== The early Cape League era (1923–1939) ====
In 1923, the Cape Cod Baseball League was formed and initially included four teams: Falmouth, Chatham, Osterville, and Hyannis. This early Cape League operated through the 1939 season and disbanded in 1940, due in large part to the difficulty of securing ongoing funding during the Great Depression.

During this period, teams from various towns moved in and out of the league each season. The Brewster Athletic Association was formed in 1932, but did not enter a team in the Cape League during this era. In 1933, the Brewster A.A. joined the newly-formed Lower Cape Twilight League under manager Howard Dunnells. Tragedy touched the Brewster team twice early on, as manager Dunnells died suddenly after the 1933 season, and early in the 1934 season umpire John Demotte, stepson of novelist Charles Neville Buck, was killed by a foul ball during a game between Brewster and Orleans at Eldredge Park.

==== The Upper and Lower Cape League era (1946–1962) ====
The Cape League was revived after World War II, and was originally composed of 11 teams across Upper Cape and Lower Cape divisions. Brewster began play in the Cape League in 1948, entering the Lower Cape Division as its sixth team, along with Orleans, Chatham, Harwich, Yarmouth, and Dennis.

After the 1951 season, Brewster withdrew from the league, but was back in 1956, and remained in the league through the 1960 season. In 1958, undefeated world heavyweight champion and Brockton, Massachusetts native Rocky Marciano was in the stands to cheer on his younger brother Pete, who played catcher for Brewster.

=== Modern era (1963–present) ===
==== The 1980s and the birth of the Whitecaps ====
Throughout the 1960s and 1970s, Brewster did not field a team in the Cape League. In 1988, the league added Brewster and Bourne as expansion teams, bringing the number of teams in the league to its current ten. The Brewster entry was dubbed the "Whitecaps", a moniker suggested by Brewster native William Turkington and inspired by "the wind marching the waves steadily across Cape Cod Bay."

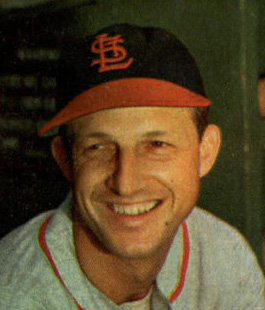
Baseball Hall of Famer Stan Musial helped raise funds for the fledgling Whitecaps in 1988.

Baseball Hall of Famer Stan Musial came to town in early 1988 to help raise funds for the new franchise, and Brewster's Ocean Edge Resort brought Boston Celtics star and Basketball Hall of Famer Kevin McHale to toss a ceremonial first pitch in July. The Whitecaps played their home games at Cape Cod Regional Technical High School, just over the border in Harwich. The use of Cape Cod Tech was intended to be temporary, but continued through 2005.

The 1988 Whitecaps team was led by skipper Joe Walsh, and featured future major leaguers Mike Myers and F.P. Santangelo. The undisputed star of the team was slugging first baseman Dave Staton. Staton ushered in the Whitecaps era with an opening-day performance marked by two home runs and six RBI. In a season when the CCBL featured a glut of future major league talent, including sluggers such as Frank Thomas and Mo Vaughn, Staton led all with 16 homers and 46 RBI, and was named league MVP. He posted a .772 slugging percentage, and missed capturing the league's triple crown by just two points, his .359 average falling just shy of Chuck Knoblauch's .361 mark. Staton was inducted into the CCBL Hall of Fame in 2004.

After posting a respectable 17–25 record in its inaugural season, Brewster qualified for the postseason in only its second year. The 1989 team was piloted by Rolando Casanova, and finished the regular season tied with Chatham for second place in the East Division. Brewster overcame the A's in a single-game play-in contest, but went on to fall to first place Y-D in the semi-final series, two games to none.

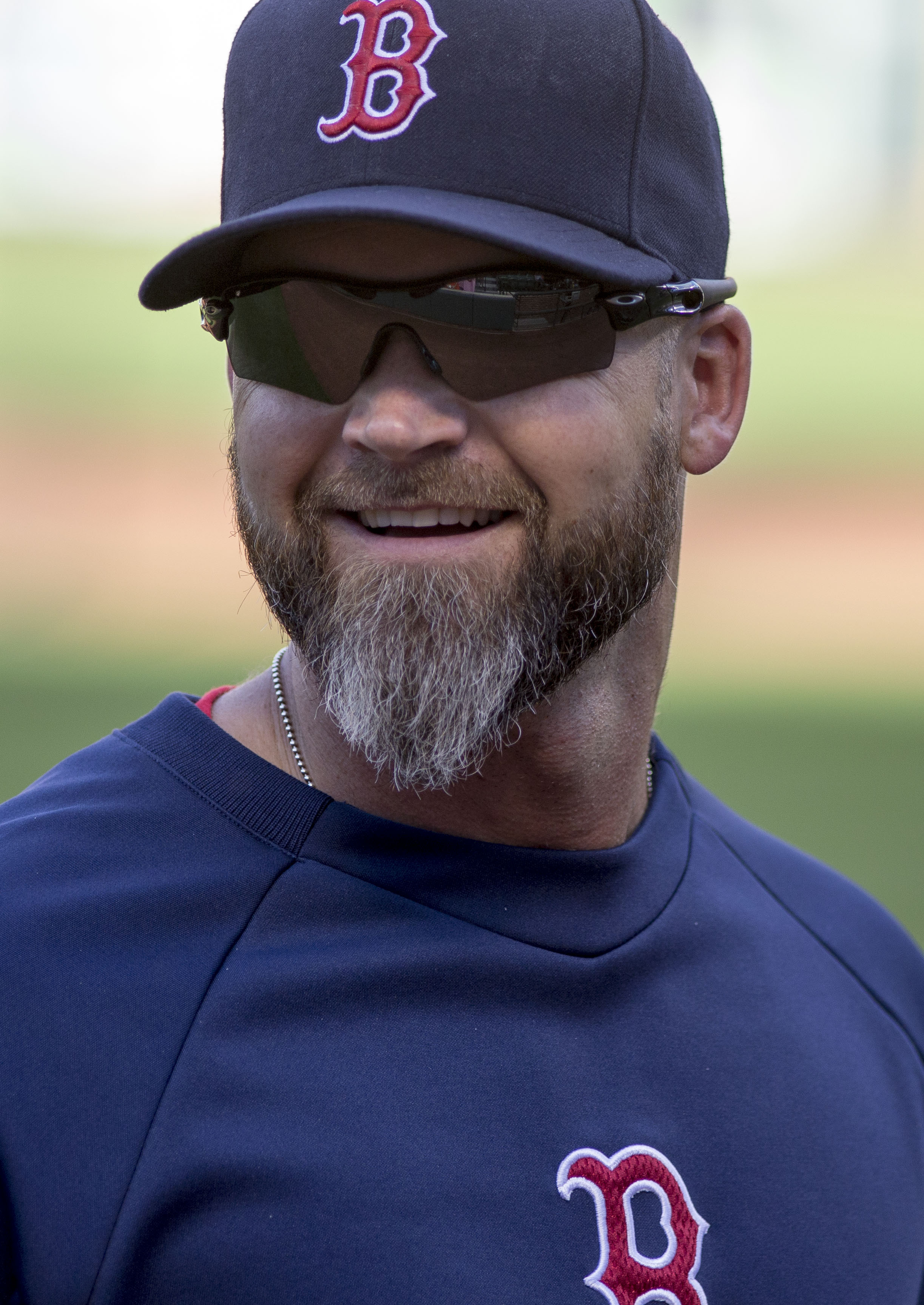
Boston World Series hero David Ross was a Whitecap in 1996.

==== The 1990s ====
Brewster's 1992 team starred CCBL Hall of Fame pitcher Billy Wagner, who fanned 79 batters in 44.1 innings of work, and was named the league's Outstanding Pro Prospect. In 2025, Wagner was elected to the National Baseball Hall of Fame in Cooperstown, New York. Whitecap players took home hardware as East Division MVP's of the CCBL All-Star Game in three consecutive seasons, as Will Scalzitti claimed the honors in 1991, Wagner in 1992, and Geoff Blum in 1993.

Manager Bill Mosiello's 1994 Whitecaps squad starred CCBL Hall of Famer Sean Casey, who hit .338 with 40 RBI, and led all first basemen with a .993 fielding percentage. Casey finished the season with an 11-game hitting streak during which he maintained a torrid .488 pace at the plate. The team reached the playoffs and disposed of Orleans two games to one in the semi-finals to give the Whitecaps their first berth in the CCBL title series, where they were eventually downed by Wareham in two straight games.

Mosiello's club finished in first place in the East Division in 1996 and 1998, but were bounced in the semi-finals both seasons by Chatham. The 1996 team featured league Outstanding Relief Pitcher Drew Fischer, who posted 13 saves on the season, and David Ross, who later became a fan favorite of the hometown Boston Red Sox and played a key role in Boston's 2013 World Series title. The 1998 Whitecaps featured future major league all-star Chase Utley and CCBL Hall of Famer Bobby Kielty. Kielty was tops in the league with a .384 average, clubbing six home runs with 45 RBI and was named the league MVP.

==== The 2000s: A first championship and a homecoming to Brewster ====
Brewster began the 2000s in dramatic fashion by claiming its first league championship. Led by manager Dave Lawn, the 2000 Whitecaps went 28–16 in the regular season, finishing atop the East Division. Pitching coach Pat Shine took over managerial duties when Lawn left with a week remaining in the regular season to take a coaching job at USC. The Whitecaps were led by league batting champ Steve Stanley (.329) and the league's Outstanding Relief Pitcher, Dan Rich. In the playoffs, Brewster defeated Chatham two games to one to advance to the championship series.

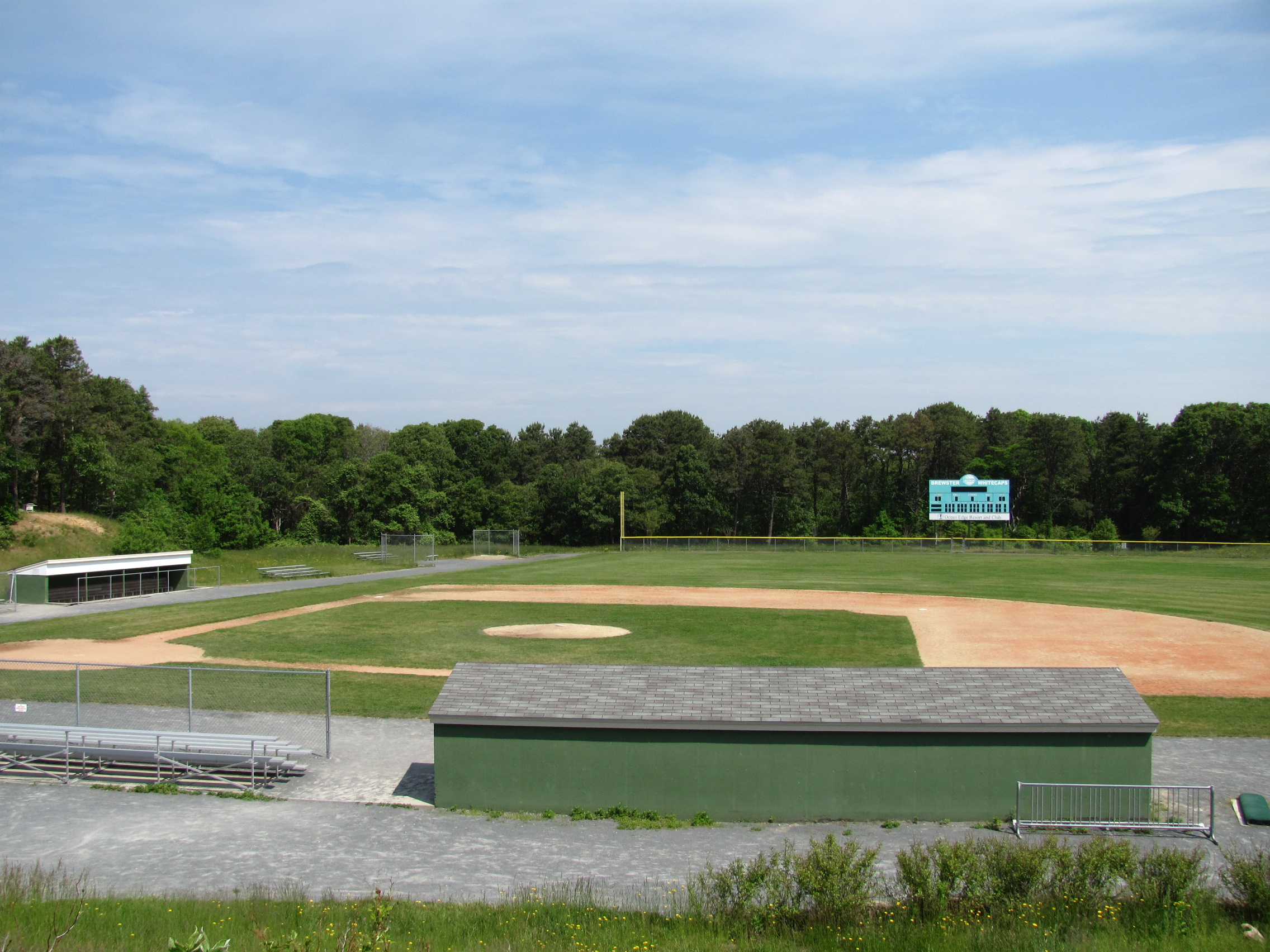
Stony Brook Field, home of the Whitecaps since 2006

Facing Hyannis for the title, the Whitecaps relied on a mixture of pitching and small ball. In Game 1 at Cape Tech, Whitecap lefty hurler Ryan Olson kept the Mets at bay through eight innings, allowing only five hits. Brewster capitalized on a pair of walks in the seventh to score the game's only two runs. Behind the solid work of starter Mike Wodnicki in Game 2, Brewster combined a mix of bunts, walks and stolen bases to build an early 5–0 lead on a drizzly day in Hyannis. The Whitecaps held on to a 6–2 victory to complete the series sweep and take home the title. Playoff MVP honors went to Brewster's Jack Headley, who made a key catch in the field to preserve the Game 1 victory, and went 5-for-18 at the plate in the title series.

In 2002, the Whitecaps featured exciting San Diego State University centerfielder Tony Gwynn Jr., son of Baseball Hall of Famer Tony Gwynn. Skipper Bob Macaluso took the Whitecaps' helm in 2003 and guided the club to the playoffs in three of his six years at the post. Macaluso's 2003 club finished in first place in the East Division and featured league Outstanding Relief Pitcher Jarrett Santos and CCBL Hall of Famer J.C. Holt. Holt recorded a 21-game hitting streak during the season, and went on to wear the league batting crown with a .388 mark.

The Whitecaps boasted the league's batting champ for a second consecutive season in 2004 when Ryan Patterson hit at a .327 clip. The 2004 team also included future major league all-star Ryan Braun, as well as the league's Outstanding Pitcher and CCBL Hall of Famer Matt Goyen, who posted a 5–2 mark with a 1.25 ERA and 80 strikeouts, including an 18-strikeout game at Orleans.

The Whitecaps came home to Brewster in 2006, as a grant from the Yawkey Foundation and matching funds from the team allowed for the construction of a field behind Stony Brook Elementary School. The 2006 team featured CCBL Hall of Famer Shaun Seibert, who posted a 6–0 record with a microscopic 0.39 ERA and was co-recipient of the league's Outstanding Pitcher Award.

==== The 2010s: Brewster claims a second title ====
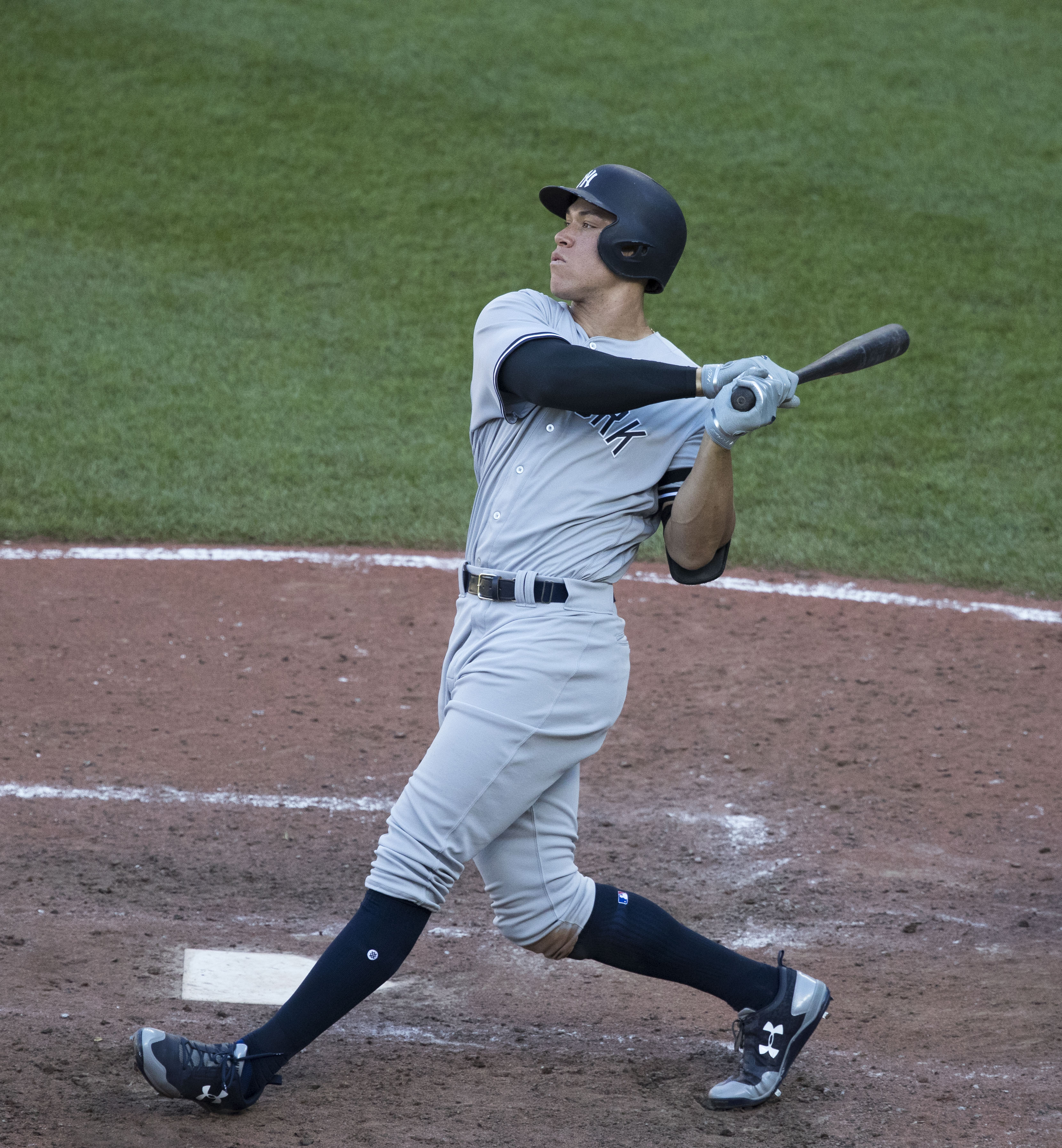
Slugger Aaron Judge played for the Whitecaps in 2012.

Brewster qualified for the postseason in six of ten years in the 2010s. The 2012 Whitecaps featured future major league all-stars Jeff McNeil and Aaron Judge. Judge, a towering 6-foot-7 slugger, clouted 5 homers and batted .270 for Brewster. In 2014, Whitecap Wade Wass set CCBL single game records by crushing two grand slams and driving in nine runs against Wareham in a game nationally telecast by Fox College Sports.

Manager Jamie Shevchik joined the Whitecaps in 2015, and led the club to a second-place finish and playoff berth in his first campaign. The 2015 team featured league Outstanding Relief Pitcher Thomas Hackimer and CCBL Hall of Famer Nick Senzel, who hit .364 and took home both the league MVP and Outstanding Pro Prospect awards.

In 2017, Brewster finished the regular season 21–21–2 and faced three-time defending champion Yarmouth-Dennis in the first round of the playoffs. The Whitecaps upset the Red Sox with an 8–7, extra inning, Game 3 win on the road. With the victory, Brewster claimed its first postseason series since 2000, and advanced to the East Division championship against top-seeded Orleans. The Whitecaps again pulled off the upset in dramatic fashion on the road in game three, this time relying on late signee Conor McNamara from Marist College to pitch seven innings before a go-ahead 8th inning home run by Marty Costes from the University of Maryland gave Brewster a 2–1 win.

In the championship series, Brewster faced Bourne in a matchup of the 1988 expansion clubs. The Whitecaps won Game 1 at home on a walk-off hit-by-pitch in the tenth, then fell to Bourne on the road in Game 2, 13–7, to set up a decisive game three. Whitecaps starter Will Tribucher twirled six and two-thirds shutout innings, and Hunter Bishop delivered the decisive blow, hammering his third home run of the playoffs to put Brewster up 2–0 in the sixth. The score was preserved by a diving catch on the warning track by Costes with the bases loaded and two outs in the top of the seventh, and Brewster hung on to win by the 2–0 tally to secure its second league championship. Bishop shared playoff MVP honors with Nick Dunn, who batted .500 in the championship series.

The Whitecaps' stars shone brighter than all at the 2019 CCBL All-Star Game. Prior to the game, Brewster third baseman Tyler Hardman slugged his way to victory in the home run derby. Brewster's Brett Auerbach and Gage Workman were named game co-MVPs for the East Division, with Auerbach delivering the ninth-inning walk-off RBI single to win the game for the East, 6–5.

==== The 2020s: A third Whitecaps championship ====
The 2020 CCBL season was cancelled due to the coronavirus pandemic, and the Whitecaps were dealt an additional blow as former skipper John Altobelli was among the nine killed in the helicopter crash that claimed the life of NBA legend Kobe Bryant.

The 2021 Whitecaps finished in first place atop the East Division, and faced Harwich in the playoff semi-finals. In Game 1 at home, Brewster outfielder Chad Castillo went 3-for-4 with a double and two RBIs that accounted for all the scoring as Whitecap hurlers Brian Fitzpatrick, Michael Prosecky and closer Dale Stanavich combined for the 2–0 shutout win. Brewster got a homer from Tony Bullard early in Game 2 at Whitehouse Field, and was tied with the Mariners, 4–4, going to the top of the ninth. With the bases full of Whitecaps, a balk call brought in the go-ahead run, and Stanavich came on in the bottom of the inning to strike out the side and send Brewster to the CCBL title series. Facing a powerful Bourne club in a rematch of the 2017 finals, the Whitecaps came away from Doran Park with a familiar-looking 2–0 Game 1 shutout win, as Griffin Green combined with Prosecky and Stanavich to hold the Braves scoreless, while Kurtis Byrne's two-run double accounted for the game's only runs. Hoping to complete the series sweep in Game 2 at Stony Brook Field, Brewster trailed early, 5–0, after a Bourne first-inning explosion. Whitecap Zach Neto answered with a homer in the bottom of the frame, and Brewster proceeded to chip away at the Braves' lead. With the score knotted at 6–6 after six, Bullard blasted a home run to lead off a four-run Caps seventh, and Brewster held on to clinch the championship with a 10–6 win. Castillo took home playoff MVP honors, batting .400 for the postseason with three runs and three RBI.

The Whitecaps reached the finals again in 2022 and faced the Bourne Braves for a second consecutive season, but Bourne exacted its revenge as former Brewster pitching coach Scott Landers skippered the Braves to a two-game sweep of the Caps.

== CCBL Hall of Fame inductees ==
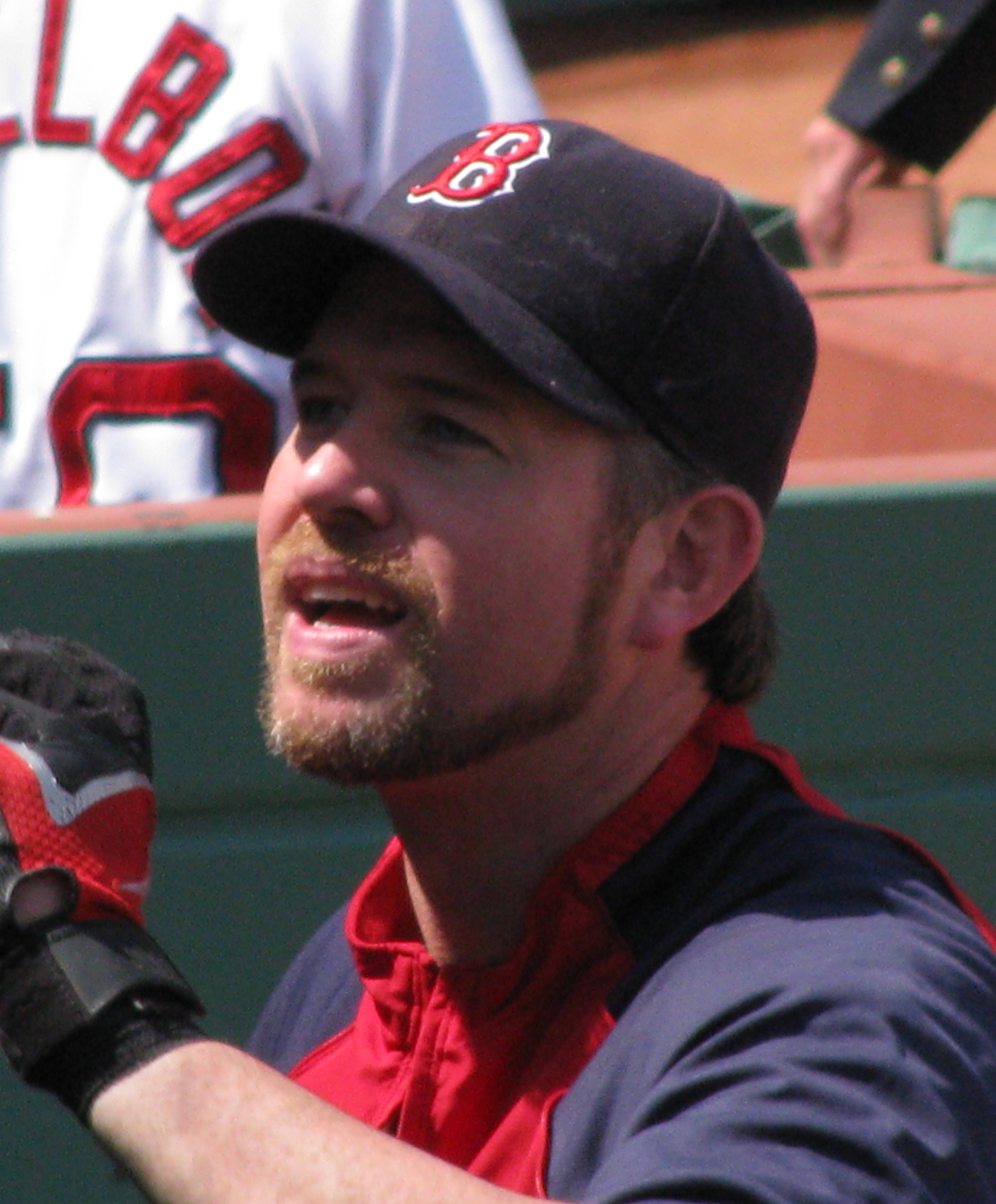
CCBL Hall of Famer Sean Casey

The CCBL Hall of Fame and Museum is a history museum and hall of fame honoring past players, coaches, and others who have made outstanding contributions to the CCBL. Below are the inductees who spent all or part of their time in the Cape League with Brewster.

| Year Inducted | Ref. | Name | Position |
|---|---|---|---|
| 2003 | | Sean Casey | Player |
| 2004 | | Dave Staton | Player |
| 2005 | | Bobby Kielty | Player |
| 2016 | | J.C. Holt | Player |
| 2019 | | Shaun Seibert | Player |
| 2020 | | Sol Yas | Executive |
| 2022 | | Billy Wagner | Player |
| 2024 | | Nick Senzel | Player |
| 2026 | | Matt Goyen | Player |

== Notable alumni ==
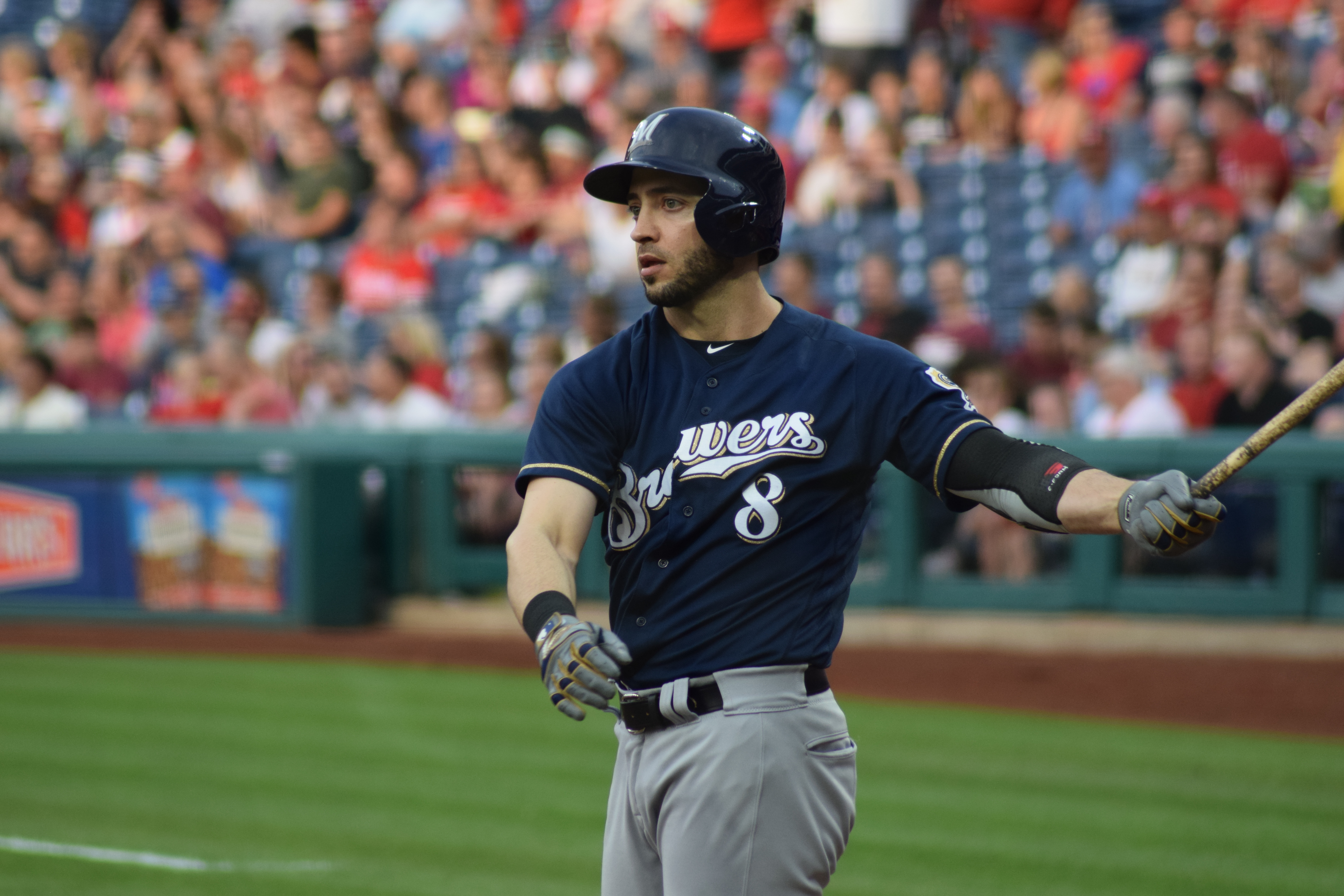
Ryan Braun

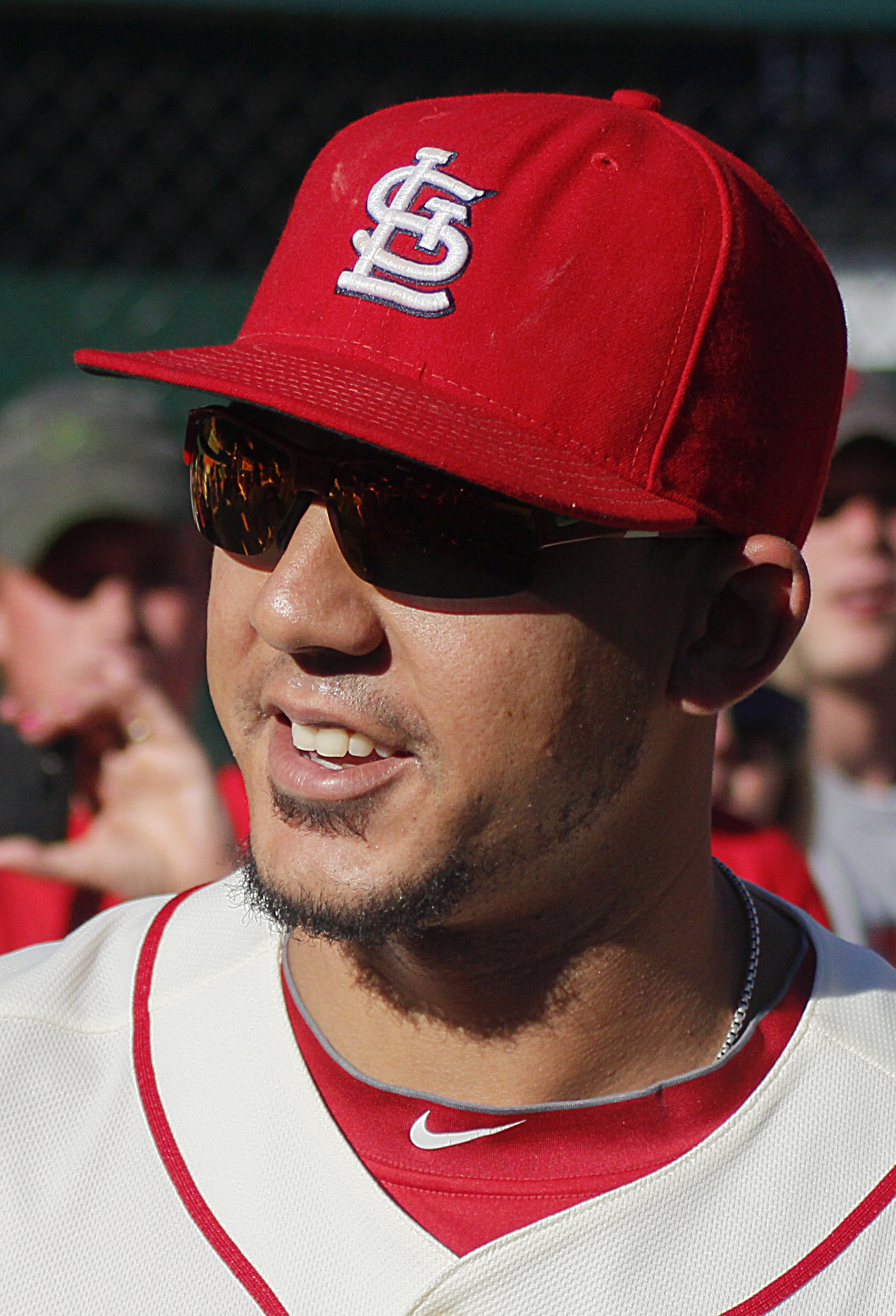
Jon Jay

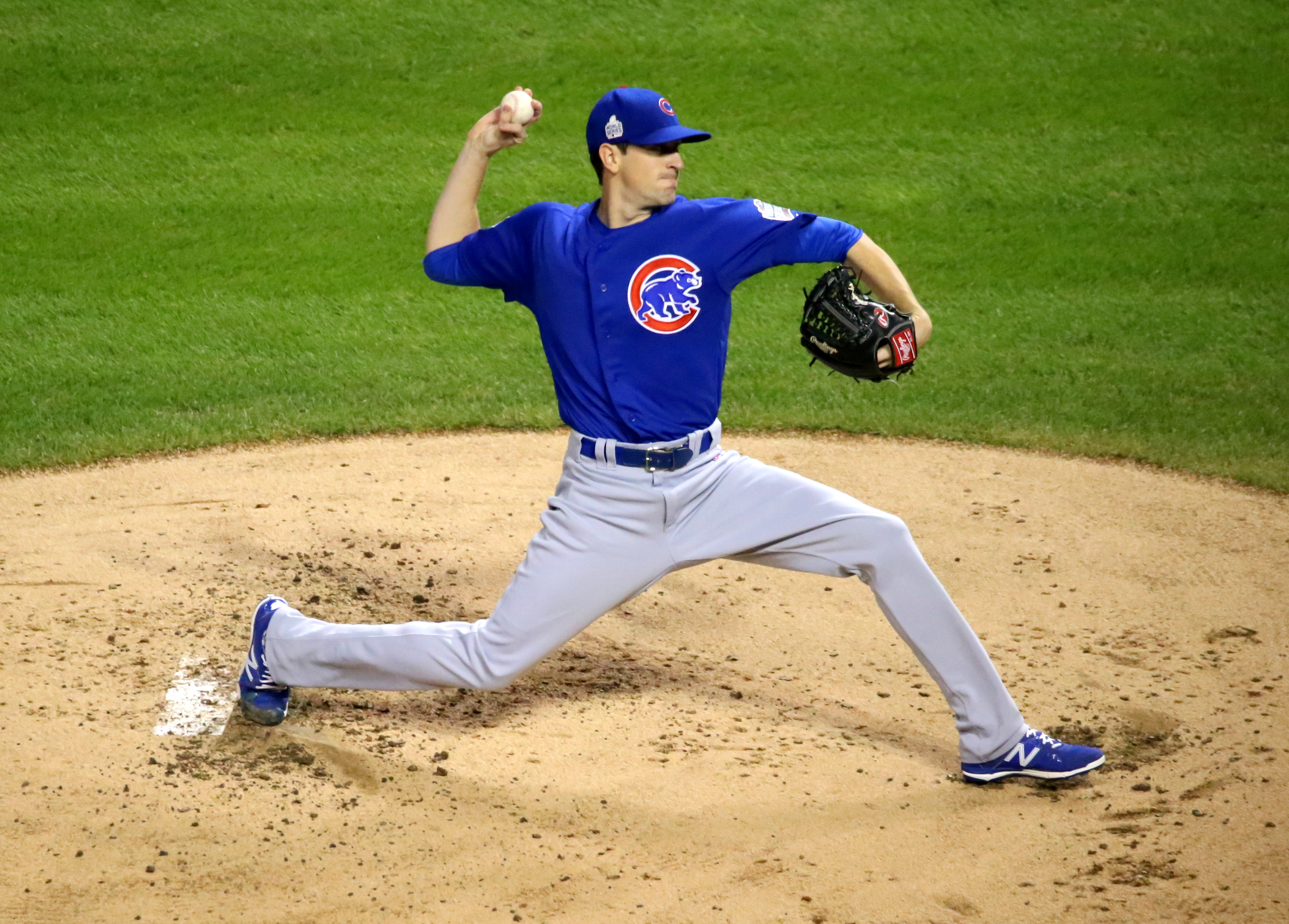
Kyle Hendricks

- David Adams 2006
- Scott Alexander 2009
- Yonder Alonso 2007–2008
- Garvin Alston 1990–1991
- Armando Alvarez 2015
- John Andreoli 2010
- Mike Avilés 2002
- Roger Bailey 1991
- Darren Baker 2018
- Brian Bannister 2001
- Luke Bard 2010–2011
- Brian Barden 2001
- Mason Barnett 2021
- Jake Barrett 2010
- Brady Basso 2018
- Aaron Bates 2005
- Buddy Baumann 2008
- Todd Belitz 1995
- Rigo Beltrán 1989–1990
- Erik Bennett 1988
- Luke Berryhill 2019
- Jon Berti 2010
- Joe Biagini 2011
- Braden Bishop 2014
- Hunter Bishop 2017–2018
- Brian Bixler 2003
- Mason Black 2019
- Ryan Bliss 2019
- Geoff Blum 1993
- Brennan Boesch 2005
- Ryan Braun 2004
- Brian Buchanan 1993
- David Buchanan 2010
- Andy Burns 2010
- Dan Butler 2009
- Mark Canha 2009
- Dominic Canzone 2018
- Cesar Carrillo 2004
- Matt Carson 2001
- Sean Casey 1994
- J. T. Chargois 2011
- Frank Charles 1989–1990
- Rocky Cherry 2000
- Nick Christiani 2008
- Ryan Cook 2007
- David Cooper 2006–2007
- Caleb Cotham 2008–2009
- Collin Cowgill 2006
- Jeff Criswell 2018
- Gavin Cross 2021
- Davis Daniel 2017
- Brad Davis 2002
- Erik Davis 2006–2007
- Taylor Davis 2011
- Cole De Vries 2006
- Dustin Delucchi 1997
- Reid Detmers 2018
- Chris Dickerson 2002
- Danny Dorn 2005
- Brandon Duckworth 1997
- Cam Eden 2018
- Duke Ellis 2019
- Barry Enright 2006
- J. C. Escarra 2015
- Paul Failla 1992
- Taylor Featherston 2010
- Ryan Feltner 2016
- Paco Figueroa 2003
- Andrew Fischer 2024
- Brian Fitzpatrick 2021–2022
- Patrick Forbes 2023–2024
- Jesse Franklin V 2018
- Alex Freeland 2021–2022
- Mike Freeman 2008
- Drew Gagnon 2010
- Mickey Gasper 2017
- Tyler Gentry 2019
- Paul Gervase 2022
- Brad Glenn 2007
- Erik Goeddel 2009
- David Goforth 2009
- Yasmani Grandal 2008
- Rick Greene 1990
- Seth Greisinger 1994–1995
- Pedro Grifol 1990–1991
- Jason Grilli 1996
- Tony Gwynn Jr. 2002
- Jedd Gyorko 2009
- Ryon Healy 2012
- Scott Heineman 2013
- Ryder Helfrick 2024
- Kyle Hendricks 2010
- Matt Herges 1990
- Bryan Holaday 2009
- Bryce Hubbart 2021
- Colt Hynes 2006
- Ike Irish 2023
- Justin James 2002
- Jon Jay 2005
- Mark Johnson 1994
- Reed Johnson 1998
- Spencer Jones 2021
- Aaron Judge 2012
- Tommy Kahnle 2010
- Jake Kalish 2012
- Ty Kelly 2008
- Bobby Kielty 1998
- Bryan King 2016
- Scott Kingery 2014
- Tegan Kuhns 2025
- Matt LaPorta 2006
- Brendan Lawson 2025
- Brandon Leibrandt 2013
- Tony Locey 2017
- Seth Lonsway 2019
- Michael Lorenzen 2012
- Zac Lowther 2016
- Matt Macri 2003
- Scott Maine 2006
- Tommy Manzella 2003
- Michael Massey 2018
- Jack Mayfield 2011
- Kade McClure 2016
- Jeff McNeil 2012
- Adam Melhuse 1992
- Ben Meyer 2013
- Matt Mikulski 2019
- Bobby Miller 2018
- Tyson Miller 2015
- Sam Moll 2012
- Chad Mottola 1991
- Lyle Mouton 1990
- Chris Murphy 2018
- Colton Murray 2010
- Mike Myers 1988–1989
- Zach Neto 2021
- Mike Neu 1998–1999
- Ryan Noda 2016
- Augie Ojeda 1994
- Craig Paquette 1988
- Jarrett Parker 2009
- Eduardo Pérez 1989
- Konnor Pilkington 2016
- Cody Ponce 2014
- Jason Rakers 1993
- Anthony Ranaudo 2010
- Gary Rath 1993
- Kyle Regnault 2009
- Will Rhymes 2004
- Kenny Robinson 1991
- Jacob Robson 2015
- Andrew Romine 2006
- Brent Rooker 2016
- David Ross 1996
- Mike Rouse 2000
- Aaron Rowand 1996–1997
- Patrick Ruotolo 2014–2015
- Gaby Sánchez 2004
- F. P. Santangelo 1988
- Nolan Schubart 2024
- Nick Senzel 2015
- Andy Sheets 1991
- Jordan Sheffield 2015
- Terrmel Sledge 1997
- Chad Smith 2010
- Tyler Smith 2012
- Will Smith 2015
- Sean Spencer 1995
- Jay Spurgeon 1996
- Dave Staton 1988
- Drew Steckenrider 2011
- Jonathan Stiever 2017
- Travis Swaggerty 2017
- Taylor Tankersley 2002
- Grant Taylor 2022
- Blake Tekotte 2007
- Mark Thompson 1991
- Zack Thompson 2018
- Tyler Thornburg 2009
- James Tibbs III 2023
- Jayce Tingler 2002
- Andrew Toles 2011
- Steve Tolleson 2004
- Mike Tonis 1998
- Chase Utley 1998
- Austin Voth 2011–2012
- LaMonte Wade 2014
- Billy Wagner 1992
- Steele Walker 2017
- Todd Walker 1992
- Colin Walsh 2009
- P. J. Walters 2005
- Logan Warmoth 2016
- Adam Warren 2007
- Dusty Wathan 1994
- Luke Weaver 2012
- Kip Wells 1997
- Ryan Wheeler 2008
- Eli White 2015
- Sean White 2002
- Gage Workman 2018–2019
- Tyler Zuber 2016

== Yearly results ==
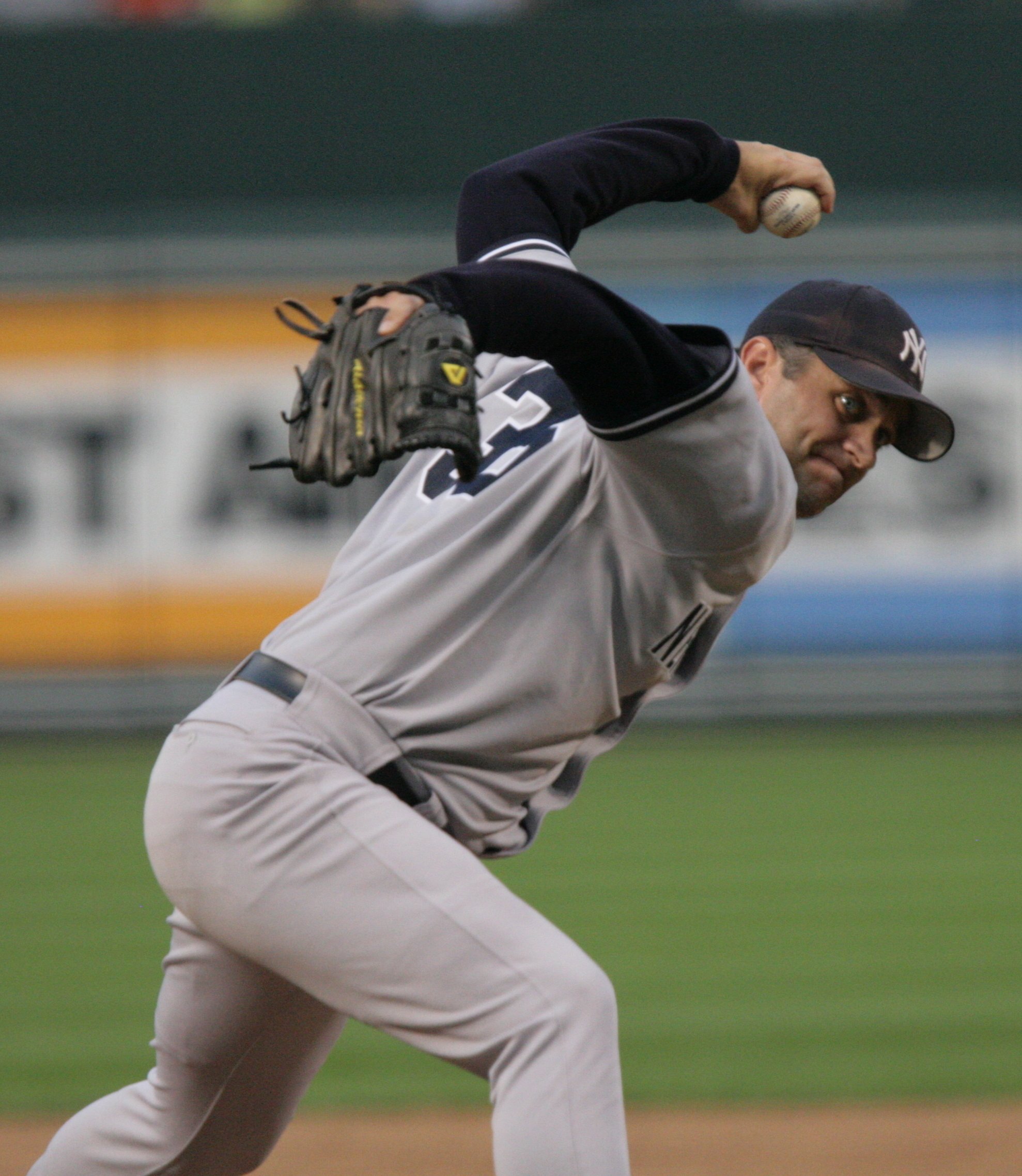
Mike Myers pitched for Brewster in 1988 and '89.

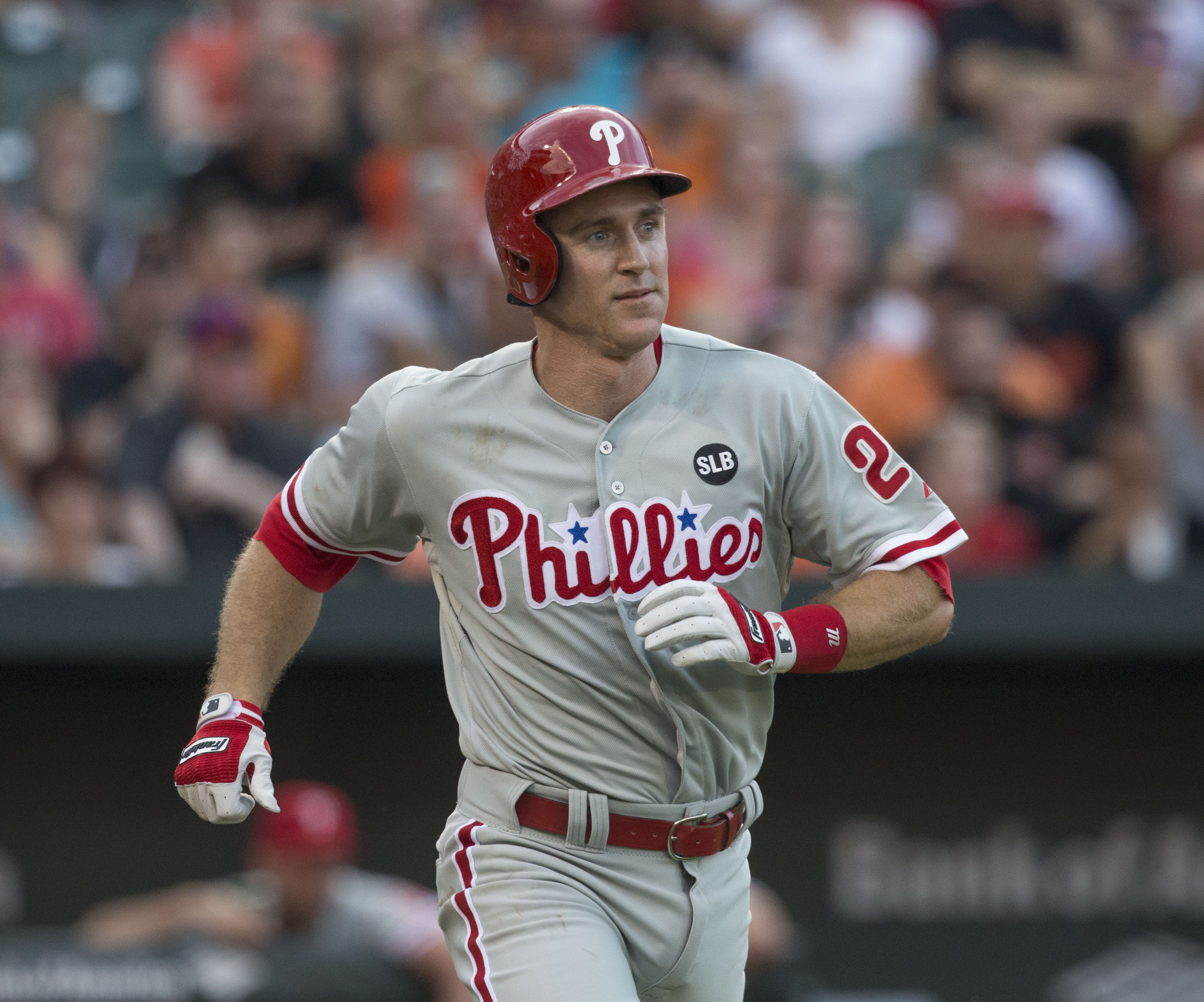
1998 Whitecap Chase Utley

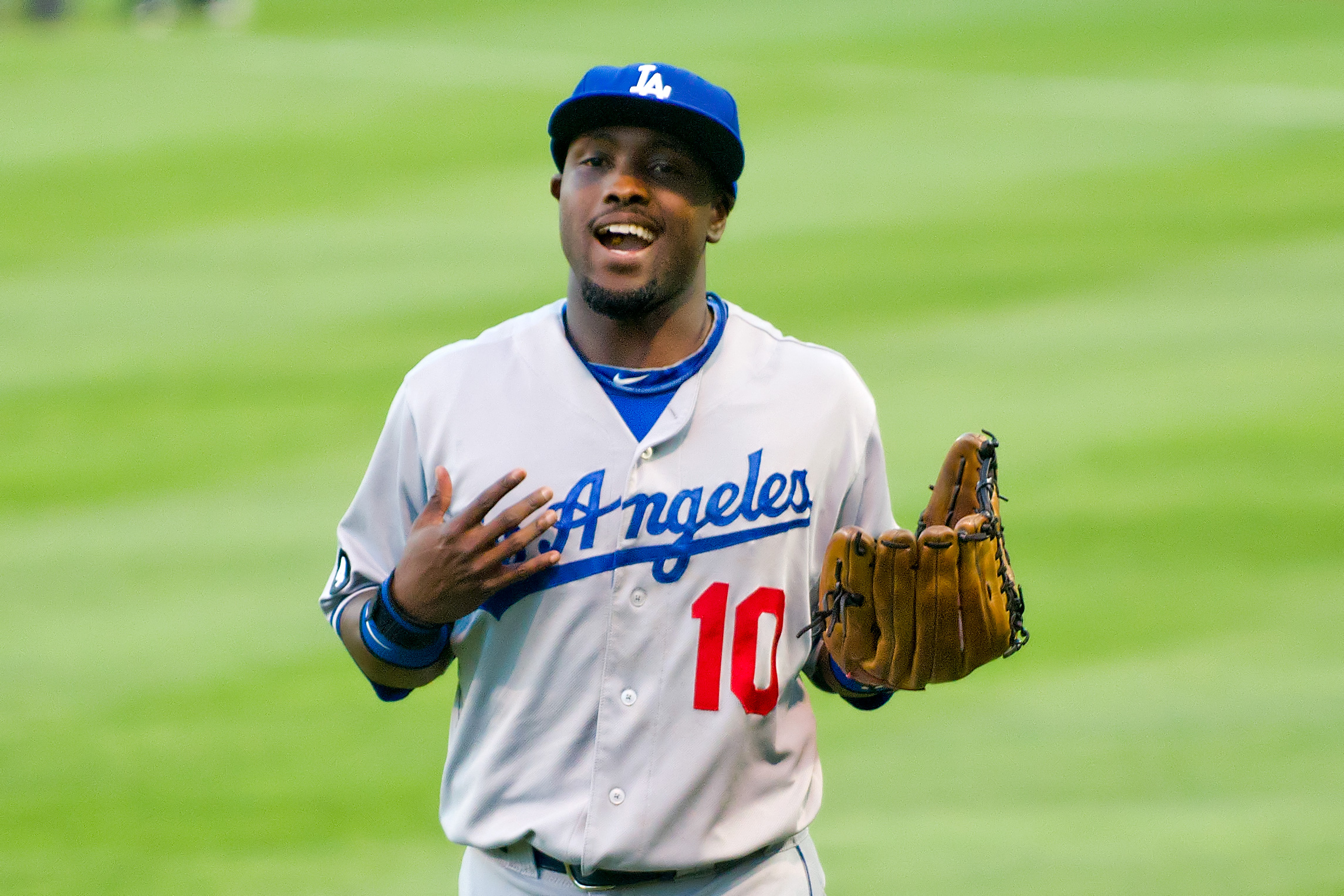
Tony Gwynn Jr., 2002 'Caps

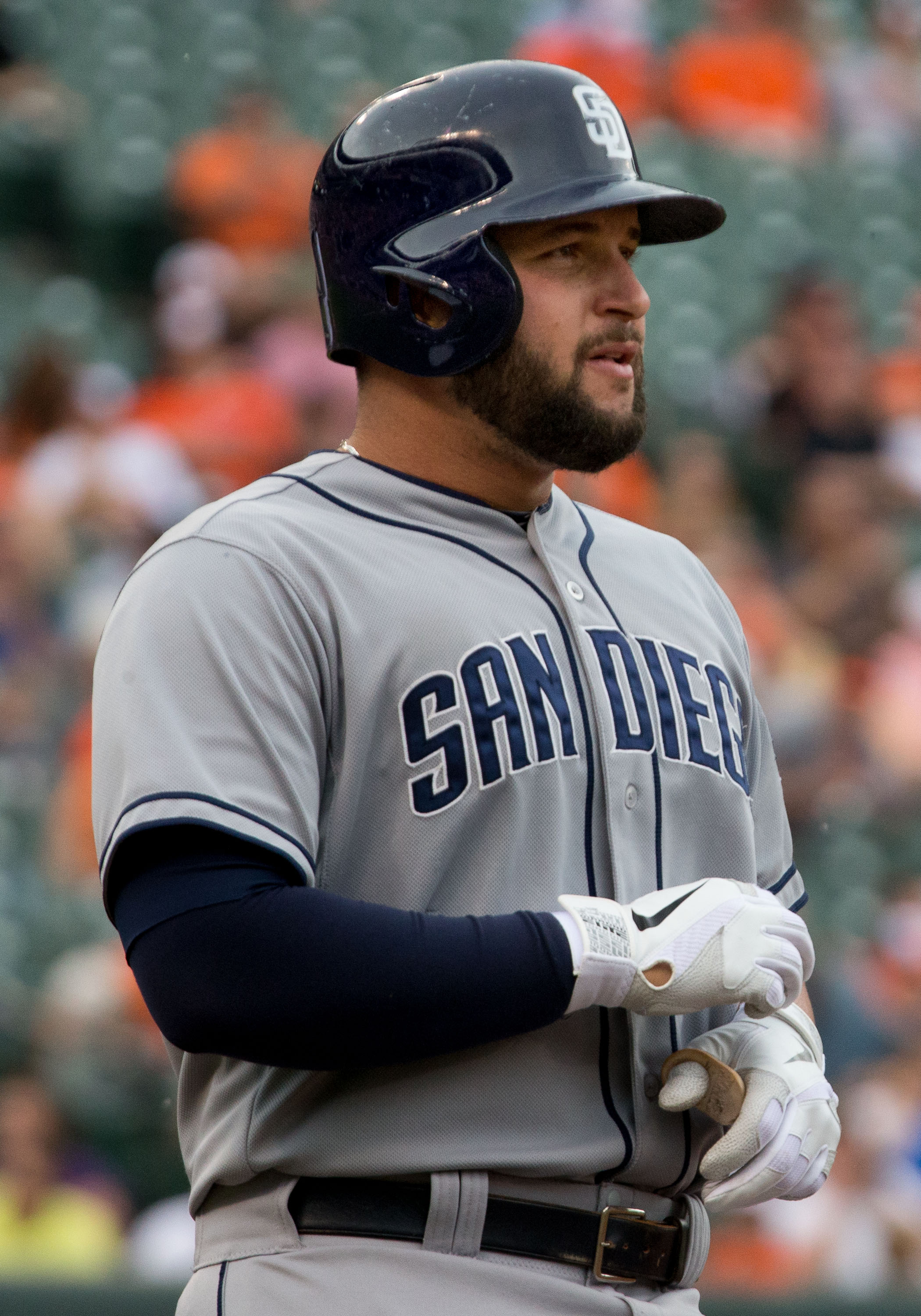
Yonder Alonso, Brewster '08

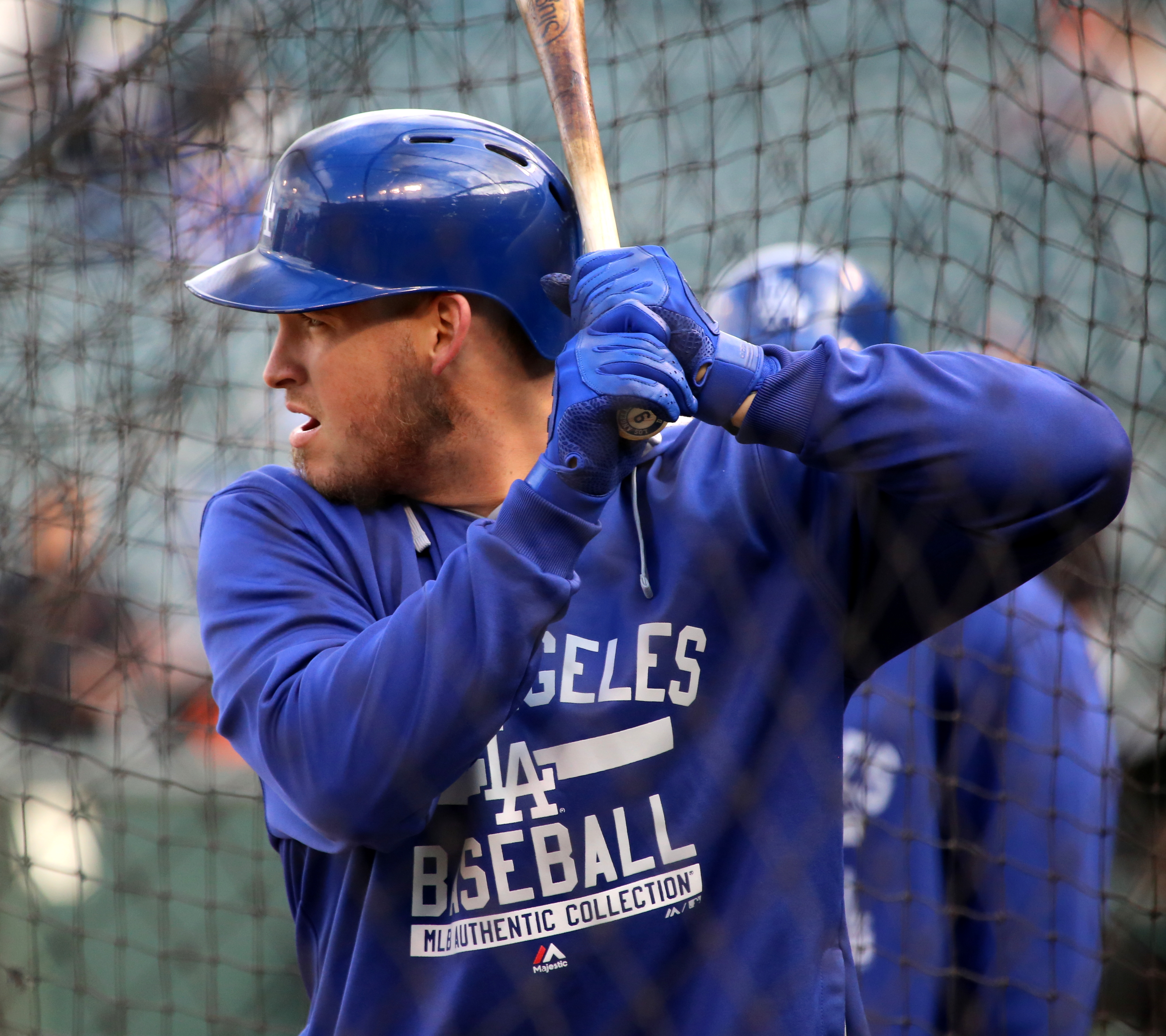
Yasmani Grandal played for Brewster in 2008.

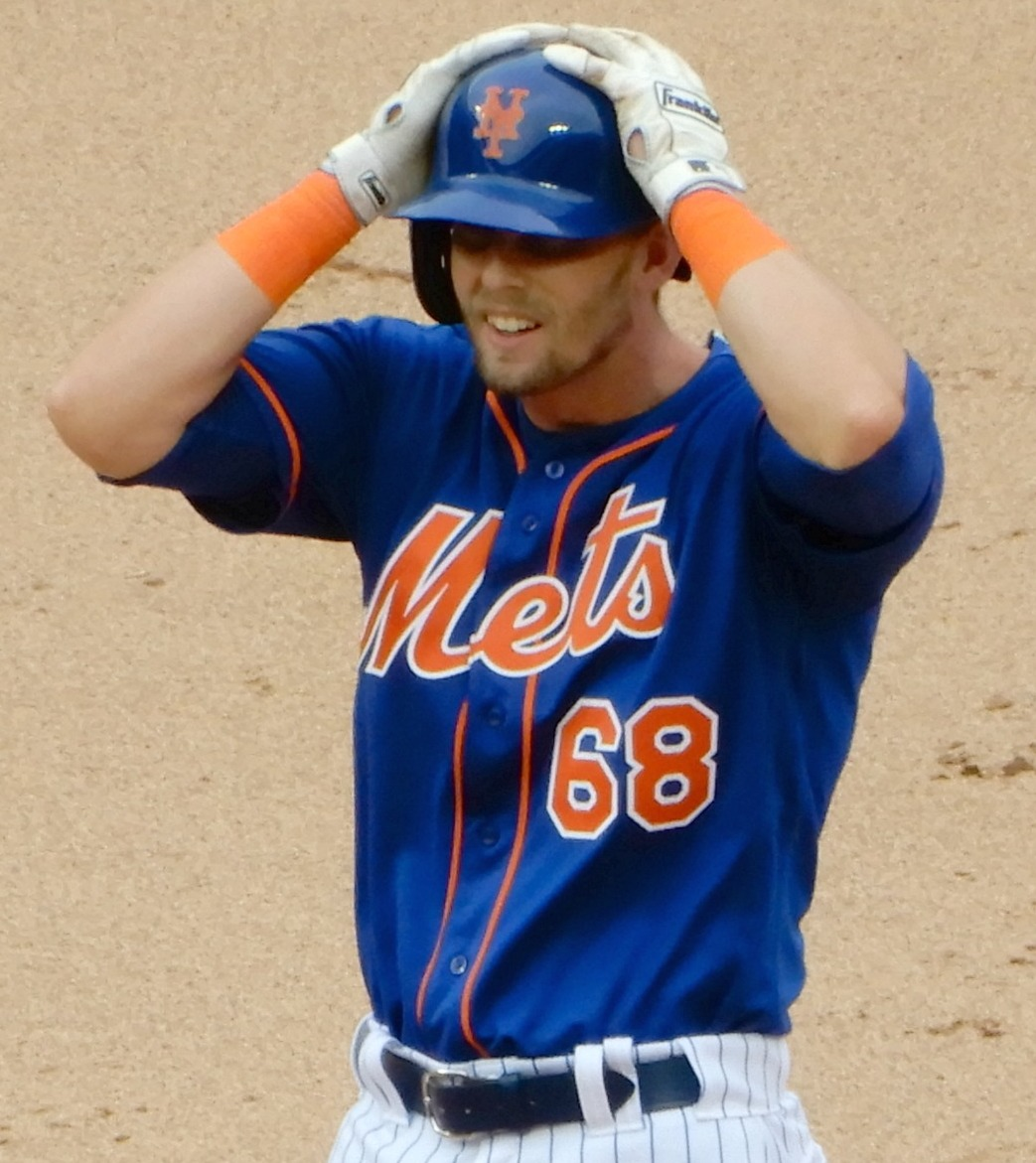
2012 Whitecap Jeff McNeil

=== Results by season, 1948–1960 ===
| Year | Won | Lost | Regular Season Finish* | Postseason | Manager | Ref. |
|---|---|---|---|---|---|---|
| 1948 | | | | | Ernie Gage | |
| 1949 | | | | | | |
| 1950 | 26 | 16 | 3rd Lower Cape Division | | | |
| 1951 | 10 | 26 | T-5th Lower Cape Division (A); T-5th Lower Cape Division (B) | | | |
| 1952 | Did not play | | | | | |
| 1953 | Did not play | | | | | |
| 1954 | Did not play | | | | | |
| 1955 | Did not play | | | | | |
| 1956 | 13 | 18 | 4th Lower Cape Division | Lost round 1 (Dennis) | | |
| 1957 | 22 | 14 | 3rd Lower Cape Division | Lost round 1 (Yarmouth) | | |
| 1958 | 20 | 10 | 2nd Lower Cape Division | Lost round 1 (Yarmouth) | | |
| 1959 | 9 | 21 | 6th Lower Cape Division | | | |
| 1960 | | | | | | |

* Regular seasons split into first and second halves are designated as (A) and (B).

=== Results by season, 1988–present ===
| Year | Won | Lost | Tied | Regular Season Finish | Postseason | Manager |
|---|---|---|---|---|---|---|
| 1988 | 17 | 25 | 0 | 5th East Division | | Joe Walsh |
| 1989 | 22 | 20 | 2 | 2nd East Division (T) | Won play-in game (Chatham); Lost semi-finals (Y-D) | Rolando Casanova |
| 1990 | 23 | 20 | 0 | 3rd East Division | | Rolando Casanova |
| 1991 | 21 | 22 | 1 | 3rd East Division | | Darren Mazeroski |
| 1992 | 26 | 18 | 0 | 2nd East Division | Lost semi-finals (Chatham) | John Hughes |
| 1993 | 23 | 20 | 1 | 3rd East Division | | Elliott Avent |
| 1994 | 24 | 18 | 1 | 2nd East Division | Won semi-finals (Orleans); Lost championship (Wareham) | Bill Mosiello |
| 1995 | 17 | 25 | 1 | 4th East Division | | Steve Rousey |
| 1996 | 23 | 20 | 1 | 1st East Division | Lost semi-finals (Chatham) | Bill Mosiello |
| 1997 | 22 | 22 | 0 | 3rd East Division | | Bill Mosiello |
| 1998 | 26 | 16 | 1 | 1st East Division | Lost semi-finals (Chatham) | Bill Mosiello |
| 1999 | 19 | 24 | 1 | 4th East Division | | Bill Mosiello |
| 2000 | 28 | 16 | 0 | 1st East Division | Won semi-finals (Chatham); Won championship (Hyannis) | Dave Lawn; Pat Shine |
| 2001 | 17 | 25 | 2 | 5th East Division | | Billy Jones |
| 2002 | 20 | 20 | 4 | 3rd East Division | | Dave Barnard |
| 2003 | 24 | 17 | 3 | 1st East Division | Lost semi-finals (Orleans) | Bob Macaluso |
| 2004 | 23 | 21 | 0 | 2nd East Division | Lost semi-finals (Y-D) | Bob Macaluso |
| 2005 | 18 | 26 | 0 | 5th East Division | | Bob Macaluso |
| 2006 | 24 | 18 | 2 | 2nd East Division | Lost semi-finals (Y-D) | Bob Macaluso |
| 2007 | 22 | 19 | 3 | 3rd East Division | | Bob Macaluso |
| 2008 | 19 | 21 | 4 | 3rd East Division | | Bob Macaluso |
| 2009 | 17 | 22 | 5 | 4th East Division | | Tom Myers |
| 2010 | 26 | 17 | 1 | 2nd East Division | Lost round 1 (Orleans) | Tom Myers |
| 2011 | 20 | 20 | 4 | 3rd East Division | Lost round 1 (Harwich) | Tom Myers |
| 2012 | 17 | 26 | 1 | 5th East Division | | John Altobelli |
| 2013 | 14 | 29 | 1 | 5th East Division | | John Altobelli |
| 2014 | 17 | 25 | 2 | 4th East Division | Lost round 1 (Harwich) | John Altobelli |
| 2015 | 24 | 19 | 1 | 2nd East Division | Lost round 1 (Y-D) | Jamie Shevchik |
| 2016 | 16 | 26 | 2 | 5th East Division | | Jamie Shevchik |
| 2017 | 21 | 21 | 2 | 3rd East Division | Won round 1 (Y-D); Won semi-finals (Orleans); Won championship (Bourne) | Jamie Shevchik |
| 2018 | 13 | 27 | 4 | 4th East Division | Won round 1 (Y-D); Lost semi-finals (Chatham) | Jamie Shevchik |
| 2019 | 18 | 22 | 4 | 5th East Division | | Jamie Shevchik |
| 2020 | Season cancelled due to coronavirus pandemic | | | | | |
| 2021 | 22 | 11 | 3 | 1st East Division | Won semi-finals (Harwich); Won championship (Bourne) | Jamie Shevchik |
| 2022 | 19 | 17 | 8 | 1st East Division (T) | Won round 1 (Harwich); Won semi-finals (Y-D); Lost championship (Bourne) | Jamie Shevchik |
| 2023 | 15 | 27 | 2 | 4th East Division (T) | Lost round 1 (Y-D) | Jamie Shevchik |
| 2024 | 13 | 25 | 2 | 5th East Division | | Jamie Shevchik |
| 2025 | 22 | 17 | 1 | 3rd East Division | Lost round 1 (Harwich) | Jamie Shevchik |
| 2026 | 25 | 12 | 3 | 2nd East Division | Lost round 1 (Harwich) | Jamie Shevchik |

== League award winners ==
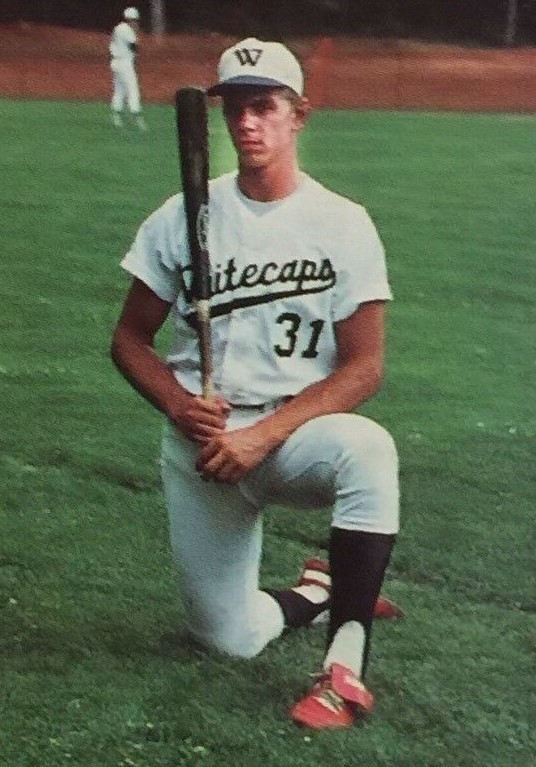
CCBL Hall of Famer Dave Staton was league MVP in 1988.

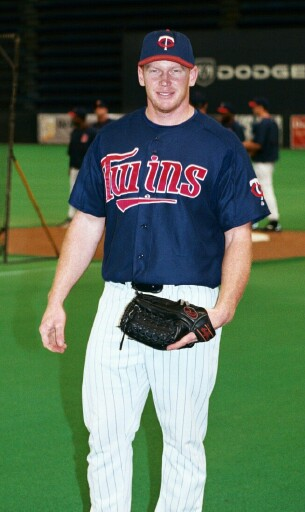
CCBL Hall of Famer Bobby Kielty, '98 MVP and batting champ

The Pat Sorenti MVP Award
| Year | Player |
|---|---|
| 1988 | Dave Staton |
| 1998 | Bobby Kielty |
| 2003 | J.C. Holt |
| 2015 | Nick Senzel |

The Robert A. McNeece Outstanding Pro Prospect Award
| Year | Player |
|---|---|
| 1992 | Billy Wagner |
| 1997 | Kip Wells |
| 2015 | Nick Senzel |
| 2026 | Jacob Lee |

The BFC Whitehouse Outstanding Pitcher Award
| Year | Player |
|---|---|
| 2004 | Matt Goyen |
| 2006 | Shaun Seibert* |

The Russ Ford Outstanding Relief Pitcher Award
| Year | Player |
|---|---|
| 1996 | Drew Fischer* |
| 2000 | Dan Rich* |
| 2003 | Jarrett Santos |
| 2015 | Thomas Hackimer* |

The Daniel J. Silva Sportsmanship Award
| Year | Player |
|---|---|
| 1998 | Ben Johnstone |
| 2006 | Matt LaPorta |
| 2021 | Kurtis Byrne |

The Manny Robello 10th Player Award
| Year | Player |
|---|---|
| 1995 | Scott Sollmann |
| 2026 | Dane Harvey |

The John J. Claffey Outstanding New England Player Award
| Year | Player |
|---|---|
| 2017 | Mickey Gasper |
| 2025 | Kyle Kipp |

The Thurman Munson Award for Batting Champion
| Year | Player |
|---|---|
| 1998 | Bobby Kielty (.384) |
| 2000 | Steve Stanley (.329) |
| 2003 | J.C. Holt (.388) |
| 2004 | Ryan Patterson (.327) |

All-Star Game MVP Award
| Year | Player |
|---|---|
| 1991 | Will Scalzitti |
| 1992 | Billy Wagner |
| 1993 | Geoff Blum |
| 1996 | C.J. Ankrum |
| 2018 | Reid Detmers |
| 2019 | Brett Auerbach* |
| 2019 | Gage Workman* |
| 2022 | Grayson Tatrow |

All-Star Home Run Hitting Contest Champion
| Year | Player |
|---|---|
| 2005 | Aaron Bates |
| 2019 | Tyler Hardman |
| 2023 | James Tibbs III |

The Star of Stars Playoff MVP Award
| Year | Player |
|---|---|
| 2000 | Jack Headley |
| 2017 | Nick Dunn* |
| 2017 | Hunter Bishop* |
| 2021 | Chad Castillo |

(*) - Indicates co-recipient

== All-Star Game selections ==
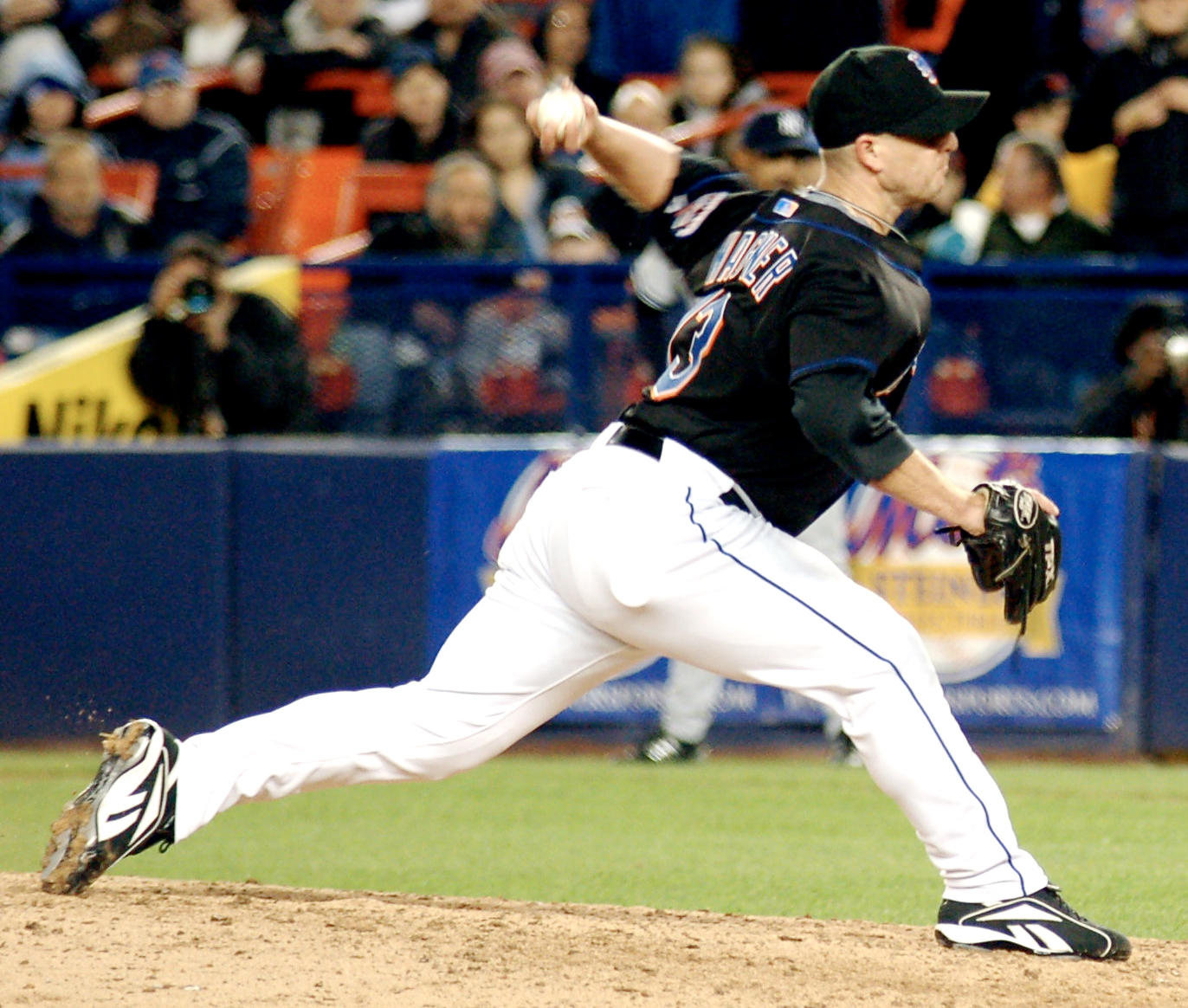
CCBL Hall of Famer Billy Wagner, 1992 Whitecaps all-star and CCBL Outstanding Pro Prospect, and 2025 National Baseball Hall of Fame inductee

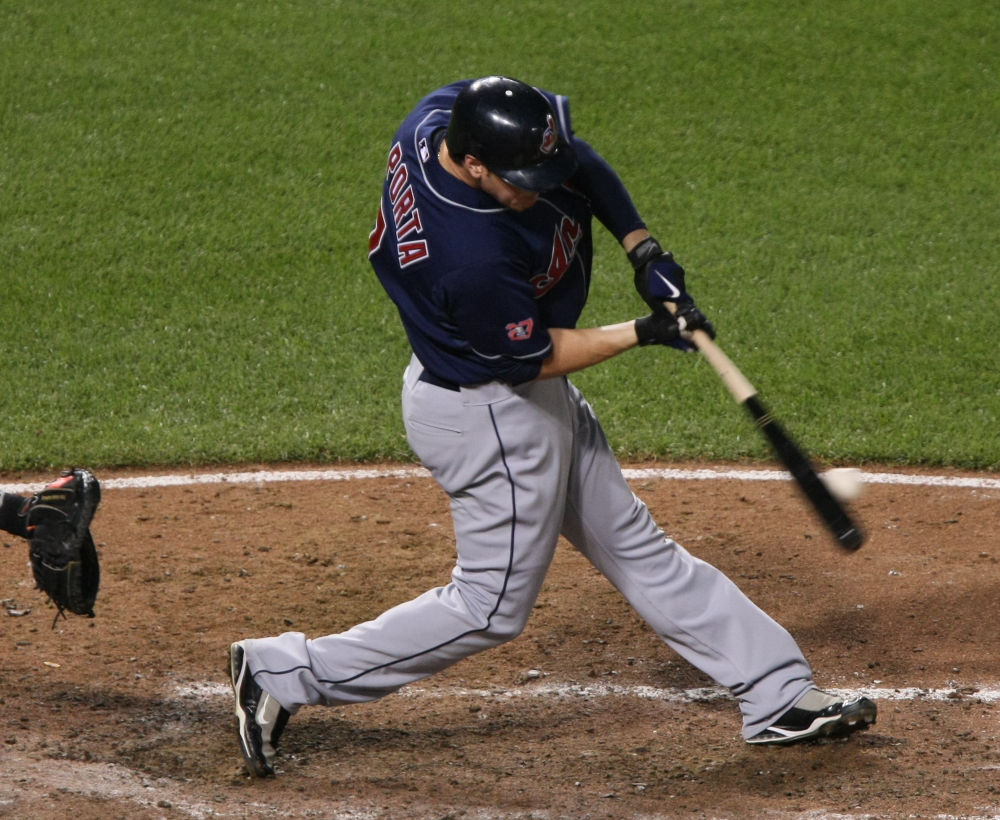
Brewster's Matt LaPorta was East Division starting first baseman at the 2006 CCBL All-Star Game.

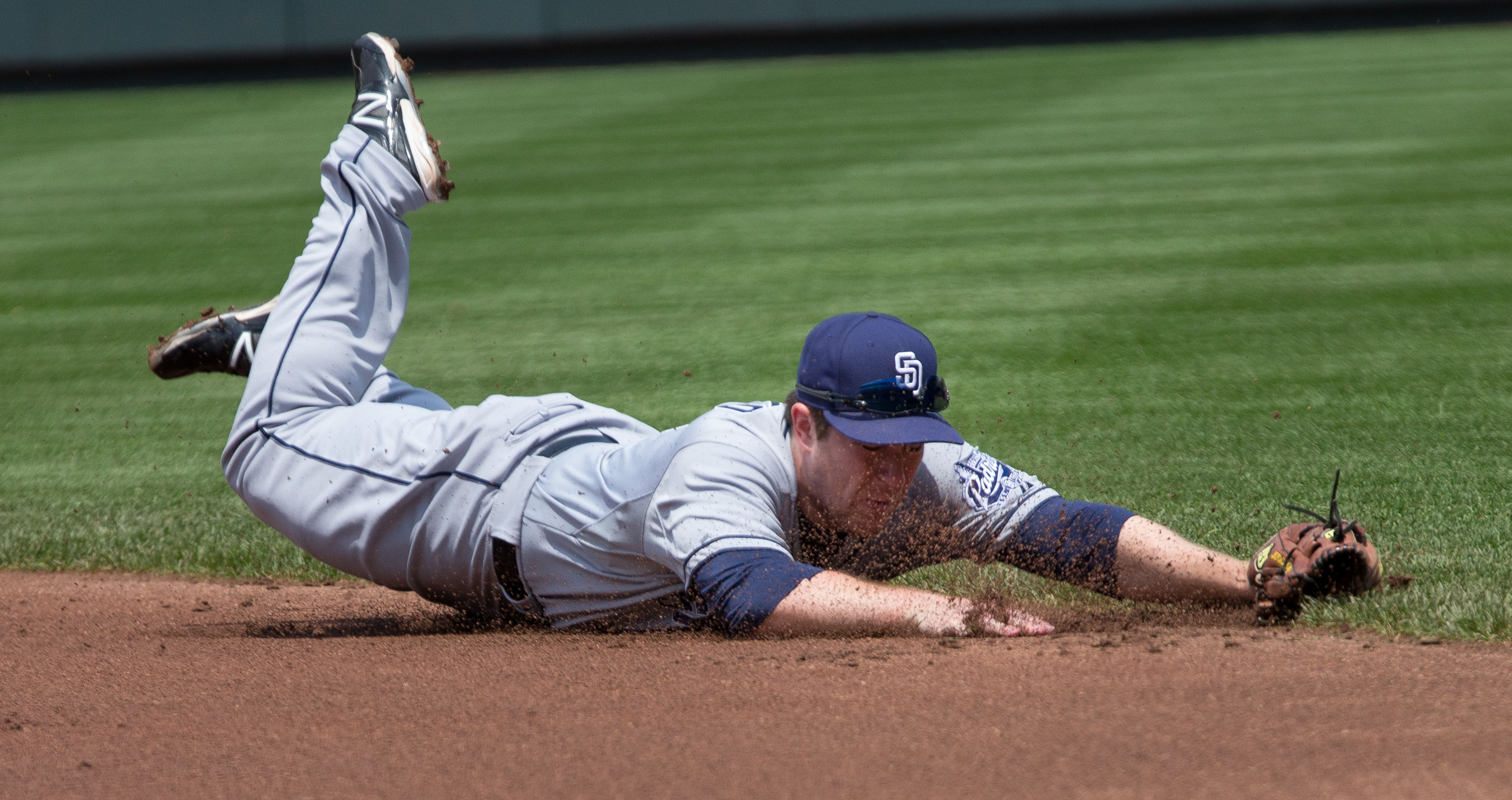
Jedd Gyorko, 2009 Brewster all-star

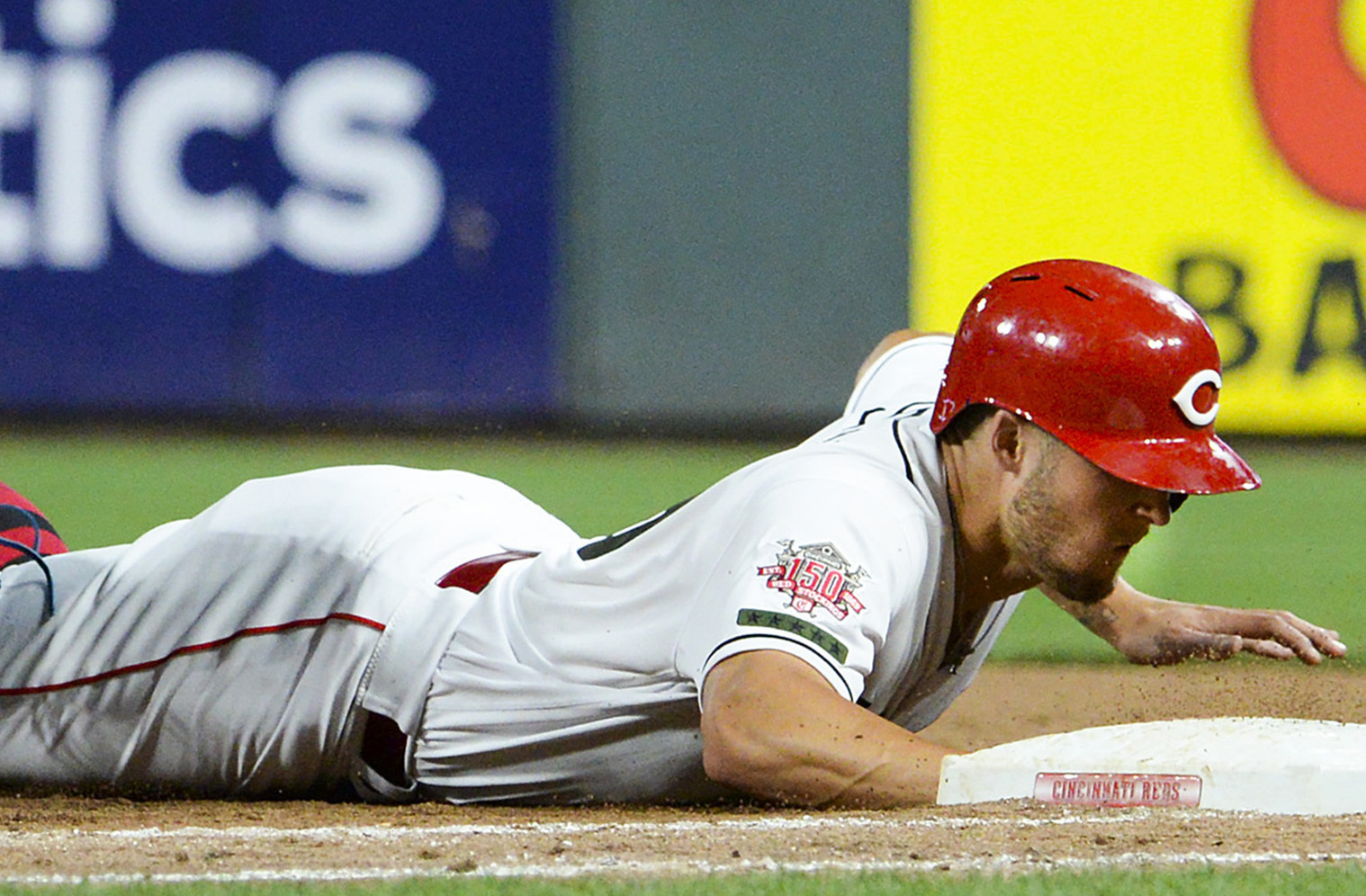
2015 all-star and CCBL Hall of Famer Nick Senzel was the league's MVP and Outstanding Pro Prospect

| Year | Players | Ref |
|---|---|---|
| 1988 | Chris Slattery, Darryl Vice, Dave Staton | |
| 1989 | Ron Maurer, Mike Myers, Todd McCray, Peter Washington | |
| 1990 | Pedro Grifol, Billy Owens, Rick Kimball, Lyle Mouton | |
| 1991 | Will Scalzitti, Marc Marini, Garvin Alston, Matt Donahue | |
| 1992 | Todd Walker, Jake Benz, Marc Ottmers, Billy Wagner | |
| 1993 | Steve Puleo, Geoff Blum, Pete Prodonov, Darrell Nicholas, Bill King, Brian Buchanan | |
| 1994 | Scott Sollman, Rodney Goble, Randy Hodges | |
| 1995 | Scott Sollman, Wynter Phoenix, Seth Greisinger, Tucker Barr | |
| 1996 | Aaron Rowand, C. J. Ankrum, Drew Fischer, Steve Immel, Scott Hild | |
| 1997 | Aaron Rowand, Richy Leon, Kip Wells, Scott Hild | |
| 1998 | Dominic Rich, Ben Johnstone, John Shirley, Mike Tonis, Bobby Kielty | |
| 1999 | Dominic Rich | |
| 2000 | Paul O’Toole, Josh Persell, Steve Stanley, Mike Weel | |
| 2001 | Chris Hamblen, Danny Matienzo, Ryan Gloger, Jay Garthwaite | |
| 2002 | Jayce Tingler, Tony Gwynn Jr., Taylor Tankersley | |
| 2003 | J.C. Holt, Ben Crabtree, Aaron Rawl, Brett Butler, Matt Macri | |
| 2004 | Ryan Patterson, Michael Campbell, Will Rhymes, Matt Goyen, Ryan Falcon | |
| 2005 | P. J. Walters, Aaron Bates | |
| 2006 | Justin Snyder, Shaun Seibert, Matt Cusick, Will Atwood, Scott Maine, Matt LaPorta | |
| 2007 | Charlie Cutler, Blake Tekotte, Mike Colla, Matt Couch, Yonder Alonso | |
| 2008 | Ryan Wheeler, Brent Milleville, Ty Kelly, Buddy Baumann, Connor Powers | |
| 2009 | Colin Walsh, John Barr, Dan Butler, Kyle Blair, Jedd Gyorko, Harold Martinez | |
| 2010 | Drew Martinez, Cohl Walla, Drew Gagnon, Colton Murray, Taylor Ard | |
| 2011 | Ryan Jones, Jason Monda, Andrew Toles, Austin Voth, J. T. Chargois, Tony Bucciferro, Tanner Nivins | |
| 2012 | Ryon Healy, Tom Windle | |
| 2013 | Trevor Mitsui, Scott Heineman, Boo Vazquez, Justin Kamplain, Aaron Brown | |
| 2014 | Mikey White, Gio Brusa, Scott Kingery, Andrew Naderer, Cody Ponce, Luke Lowery | |
| 2015 | Cassidy Brown, Colin Lyman, Thomas Hackimer, Nick Highberger, Nick Senzel | |
| 2016 | Brent Rooker, Nick Dunn, Bryce Jordan, Zac Lowther, Ryan Noda | |
| 2017 | Mickey Gasper, Michael Curry, Robert Broom, Chandler Taylor | |
| 2018 | Dominic Canzone, Cam Eden, Joe Donovan, Reid Detmers | |
| 2019 | Mason Black, Matt Mikulski, Brett Auerbach, Gage Workman, Tyler Gentry, Tyler Hardman, T.J. Collett | |
| 2020 | Season cancelled due to coronavirus pandemic | |
| 2021 | Jake Thompson, Zach Neto, Bryce Hubbart, Dale Stanavich, Michael Prosecky | |
| 2022 | Kurtis Byrne, Alex Freeland, Grayson Tatrow, Carson DeMartini, Brennen Oxford, Ryan Chasse, Cameron Fisher | |
| 2023 | Joey DeChiaro, Davis Diaz, Patrick Forbes, Ike Irish, Brock Tibbits, Will Turner, James Tibbs III, Jared Jones | |
| 2024 | Jake Clemente, Daniel Cuvet, Nick Dumesnil, Drew Faurot, Kaeden Kent, Will Ray, JD Rogers, Brody Donay, Ryder Helfrick | |
| 2025 | Lance Davis, Carson Kerce, Kyle Kipp, Dalton Wentz, Brendan Lawson, Carson Tinney | |
| 2026 | Jay Abernathy, Tate Derias, Zach Kmatz, Jaime Laskofski, Payton Manca, Cash Strayer, Jacob Lee | |

Italics - Indicates All-Star Game Home Run Hitting Contest participant

== No-hit games ==
| Year | Pitcher | Opponent | Score | Location | Notes | Ref |
|---|---|---|---|---|---|---|
| 1949 | Bob Burgess | Harwich Cape Verdeans | 6–0 | | | |
| 2000 | Pete Dunkle | Bourne | 7–0 | Cape Cod Regional Technical High School | Combined | |
| 2000 | Mike Sollie | Bourne | 7–0 | Cape Cod Regional Technical High School | Combined | |

== Managerial history ==
| Manager | Seasons | Total Seasons | Championship Seasons |
|---|---|---|---|
| Joe Walsh | 1988 | 1 | |
| Rolando Casanova | 1989–1990 | 2 | |
| Darren Mazeroski | 1991 | 1 | |
| John Hughes | 1992 | 1 | |
| Elliott Avent | 1993 | 1 | |
| Bill Mosiello | 1994; 1996–1999 | 5 | |
| Steve Rousey | 1995 | 1 | |
| Dave Lawn; Pat Shine | 2000 | 1 | 2000 |
| Billy Jones | 2001 | 1 | |
| Dave Barnard | 2002 | 1 | |
| Bob Macaluso | 2003–2008 | 6 | |
| Tom Myers | 2009–2011 | 3 | |
| John Altobelli | 2012–2014 | 3 | |
| Jamie Shevchik | 2015–2026 | 11* | 2017, 2021 |

(*) - Season count excludes 2020 CCBL season cancelled due to coronavirus pandemic.

== See also ==
- Brewster Whitecaps players
