= Colin Walsh (baseball) =

American baseball player (born 1989)

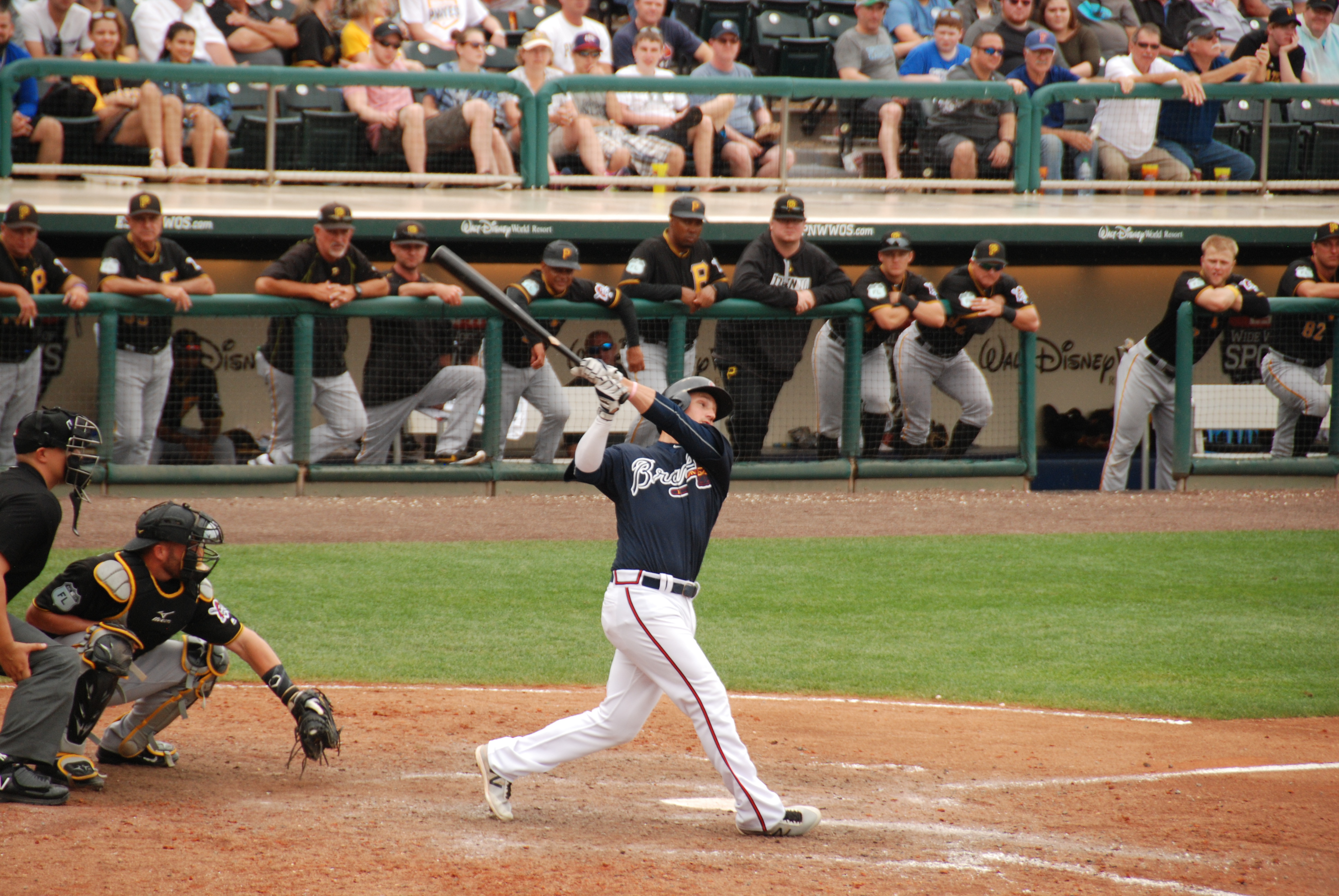
- Second baseman / Third baseman
- Born: September 26, 1989 (age 37); La Jolla, California, U.S.
- Batted: Switch Threw: Right

MLB debut
- April 4, 2016, for the Milwaukee Brewers

Last MLB appearance
- May 25, 2016, for the Milwaukee Brewers

MLB statistics
- Batting average: .085
- Home runs: 0
- Runs batted in: 2
- Stats at Baseball Reference

Teams
- Milwaukee Brewers (2016)

Colin Patrick Walsh (born September 26, 1989) is an American former professional baseball second baseman. He played in Major League Baseball (MLB) for the Milwaukee Brewers.

== Career ==
=== Amateur ===
Walsh attended The Bishop's School in La Jolla, California and later attended Stanford University and played college baseball for the Stanford Cardinal. He graduated with two engineering degrees, including a master's degree in civil engineering. In 2009, he played collegiate summer baseball with the Brewster Whitecaps of the Cape Cod Baseball League and was named a league all-star.

=== St. Louis Cardinals ===
He was drafted by the St. Louis Cardinals in the 13th round of the 2010 Major League Baseball draft.

=== Oakland Athletics ===
He signed with the Oakland Athletics prior to the 2014 season. In 2015, playing in Double–A and batting .302/.447/.470, he led all minor leaguers with 500 or more plate appearances with a walk percentage of 20.0%.

=== Milwaukee Brewers ===
Walsh was selected by the Milwaukee Brewers in the 2015 Rule 5 draft. He made the Brewers' Opening Day roster in 2016. He was designated for assignment on May 31, 2016, to create room for the newly claimed Neil Ramirez.

=== Oakland Athletics (second stint) ===
On June 4, 2016, the Brewers returned Walsh to the Oakland Athletics for $25,000, and he was assigned to the Triple-A Nashville Sounds. He played in 59 games for Nashville, batting .259/.384/.388 with four home runs and 26 RBI. Walsh elected free agency following the season on November 7.

=== Arizona Diamondbacks ===
On December 1, 2016, Walsh signed a minor league contract with the Atlanta Braves. He was released prior to the season in March 2017.

On March 25, 2017, Walsh signed a minor league contract with the Arizona Diamondbacks. He was named Southern League Player of the Week after the first week of the season. Walsh was released by the Diamondbacks organization on June 25.

=== Houston Astros ===
On July 29, 2017, Walsh signed a minor league contract with the Houston Astros organization. In 34 games split between the Double–A Corpus Christi Hooks and Triple–A Fresno Grizzlies, he hit .146 and .266, respectively, with a total of 1 home run and 7 RBI. He elected free agency following the season on November 6.

=== Sugar Land Skeeters ===
On November 28, 2017, Walsh signed a minor league contract with the Los Angeles Angels. He was released prior to the start of the season on March 28, 2018.

On May 5, 2018, Walsh signed with the Sugar Land Skeeters of the Atlantic League of Professional Baseball.

=== Kansas City T-Bones ===
On July 13, 2018, Walsh was traded to the Kansas City T-Bones of the American Association of Independent Professional Baseball. He was released on March 7, 2019

== See also ==
- Rule 5 draft results
