= Patrick Ruotolo =

American baseball player (born 1995)

- Pitcher
- Born: January 16, 1995 (age 31); Beverly, Massachusetts, U.S.
- Bats: Right Throws: Right

Patrick Anthony Ruotolo (born January 16, 1995) is an American former professional baseball pitcher.

== Early life ==
Ruotolo was born in Beverly, Massachusetts, He attended Peabody Veterans Memorial High School in Massachusetts, where he was a four-year NEC All-Starand in his junior year had an 0.28 ERA, 130 strikeouts, and a 9–1 record.

== Career ==
=== Amateur ===
He played college baseball for the UConn Huskies for three seasons. After his freshman and sophomore seasons in 2014 and 2015, Ruotolo played collegiate summer baseball with the Brewster Whitecaps of the Cape Cod Baseball League. In 2016 Ruotolo was named second team All-American Athletic Conference after saving 12 games with a 2.25 ERA.

=== San Francisco Giants ===
Ruotolo was drafted by the San Francisco Giants in the 27th round of the 2016 Major League Baseball draft. Ruotolo spent the 2017 season with the Augusta GreenJackets and made 44 appearances and posted a 4–2 record and had 17 saves out of 18 opportunities with a 1.68 ERA, and in 48 1/3 innings struck out 69 batters. He was assigned to the High–A San Jose Giants at the start of 2018 and had a 1.47 ERA over 14 appearances before being promoted to the Double-A Richmond Flying Squirrels. Later in the season Ruotolo tore the ulnar collateral ligament in his pitching elbow, requiring him to undergo Tommy John surgery.

He returned late in the 2019 season and pitched for the Arizona League Giants before being promoted to San Jose. Between the two teams, Ruotolo was 1–0 with three saves and an 0.95 ERA, as in 19 innings he struck out 24 batters. He did not play in a game in 2020 due to the cancellation of the minor league season because of the COVID-19 pandemic. Ruotolo returned to Richmond in 2021 and went 3–1 with 11 saves and a 2.68 ERA in 37 innings in which he struck out 50 batters over 39 appearances.

In 2022, pitching primarily for the Triple–A Sacramento River Cats, Ruotolo was 2–4 with three saves and a 6.49 ERA over 34 2/3 innings in which he struck out 49 batters in 29 relief appearances. He was released by the Giants organization on August 7, 2022.

=== Washington Nationals ===
On July 1, 2023, Ruotolo signed a minor league contract with the Washington Nationals organization. He made 21 appearances for the Double–A Harrisburg Senators, registering a 5.08 ERA with 30 strikeouts across 28 1/3 innings pitched. Ruotolo elected free agency following the season on November 6.
