= Billy Jones (baseball) =

American baseball player and coach

Biographical details
- Born: Kent, Washington

Playing career
- 1988: Lower Columbia College
- 1989–1990: Bellevue
- 1992: Southwest Texas State

Coaching career (HC unless noted)
- 1995–1996: Green River (Asst.)
- 1997–1998: Green River
- 1999–2000: Oregon State (Asst.)
- 2001: Arizona State (Asst.)
- 2002–2004: NC State (Asst.)
- 2005–2012: Oklahoma State (Asst.)
- 2013–2016: Appalachian State
- 2017: Tulane (Asst.)

Head coaching record
- Overall: 85-149

Billy Jones is an American college baseball coach. He had served as head coach of the Appalachian State Mountaineers baseball program from 2013 to 2016. He was named to that position prior to the 2013 season.

Jones played at Lower Columbia College and Bellevue Community College before spending his final season at Division I Southwest Texas State. He began coaching as an assistant for two seasons at Green River Community College being elevated to the head coaching position. After two more seasons, he moved to Oregon State as an assistant, where he worked with infielders for two years. Jones then spent a year in the same position at Arizona State. Following the 2001 season, he coached the Brewster Whitecaps of the Cape Cod League. In 2002, he moved to NC State, where he worked for three seasons. He started as an assistant coach, and later added recruiting coordinator duties. In 2005, Jones accepted the same position at Oklahoma State. On July 6, 2013, Jones was introduced as head coach at Appalachian State, his first Division I head coaching position.

== Head coaching record ==
The table below lists Jones' record as a head coach at the Division I level.

Record table
Season	Team	Overall	Conference	Standing	Postseason
Green River (Records Not Available) (1997–1998)
Appalachian State Mountaineers (Southern Conference) (2013–2014)
2013	Appalachian State	29–23	13–14	5th	SoCon Tournament (Note: The top 8 finishers of the SoCon's 11 teams qualified for the tournament in 2013.)
2014	Appalachian State	21–34	12–14	T-5th	SoCon Tournament (Note: All of the SoCon's 10 teams qualified for the tournament in 2014.)
Appalachian State:		50-57	25-28		
Appalachian State Mountaineers (Sun Belt Conference) (2015–2016)
2015	Appalachian State	17-36	8-21	11th	
2016	Appalachian State	18-38	9-21	11th	
Appalachian State:		35-74	17-42		
Total:		85–149			
National champion Postseason invitational champion Conference regular season champion Conference regular season and conference tournament champion Division regular season champion Division regular season and conference tournament champion Conference tournament champion
