= Jon Mueller (baseball) =

American college baseball coach (born 1970)

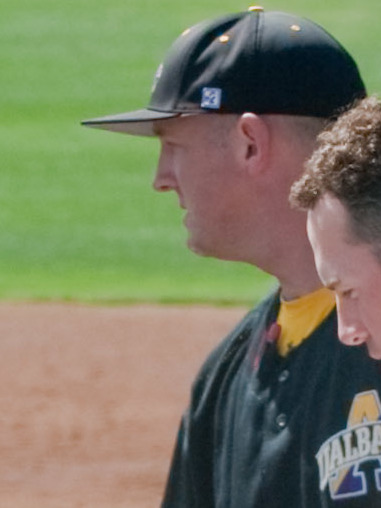
- Mueller with Albany in 2010

Current position
- Title: Head coach
- Team: Albany
- Conference: America East
- Record: 537–766–5 (.412)

Biographical details
- Born: January 26, 1970 (age 56); Stillwater, New York, U.S.
- Education: Eckerd '92 (B.A.); Saint Rose (M.A.)

Playing career

Basketball
- 1989–1991: Eckerd

Baseball
- 1989–1992: Eckerd
- 1994: Marshall Mallards
- 1995: Will County Claws
- 1995–1996: Adirondack Lumberjacks
- 1997–2000: Albany-Colonie Diamond Dogs

Coaching career (HC unless noted)
- 1993–1994: Saint Rose (asst.)
- 1999: Albany (asst.)
- 2000–present: Albany

Head coaching record
- Overall: 537–766–5 (.412)
- Tournaments: NCAA: 0–2; America East: 16–27

Accomplishments and honors

Championships
- America East tournament: 2007

Awards
- America East Coach of the Year: 2004, 2019, 2021

Jon Paul Mueller (born January 26, 1970) is an American college baseball coach who has been the head coach of Albany since the start of the 2000 season. Mueller, who was named the 2004 America East Coach of the Year, led the Great Danes to their first NCAA tournament appearance in 2007.

== Playing career ==
Mueller attended Stillwater High School in upstate New York, where he played baseball and basketball. Mueller won a state basketball championship in his senior season, 1988. He was offered a basketball scholarship at Siena, but chose instead to attend Eckerd. He played both basketball and baseball at the Florida college as a freshman and sophomore but focused exclusively on baseball as a junior and senior. He graduated in 1992.

After getting his master's degree from Saint Rose in 1994, Mueller began a seven-year professional baseball career spent entirely in independent leagues. From 1994 to 1995, he played for the Marshall Mallards and Will County Claws in the short-lived North Central League. Partway through the 1995 season, he returned to upstate New York, where he played for the Adirondack Lumberjacks from 1995 to 1996 and the Albany-Colonie Diamond Dogs from 1997 to 2000. Primarily a first baseman and an outfielder, Mueller had a career .286 batting average and hit 76 home runs.

== Coaching career ==
=== Saint Rose ===
Mueller's first coaching job came with Saint Rose from 1993 to 1994, where he worked as an assistant while getting his master's degree.

=== Albany ===
In 1999, Mueller worked as a volunteer assistant at Albany under head coach Doug O'Brey. In the program's last season in Division II, the Great Danes went 21–21 and reached the ECAC Tournament final.

Mueller was hired as Albany's head coach the following season, the Great Danes' first in Division I. Playing as an independent, they went 19–24. After the season, he played his last season of professional baseball. Albany joined the America East Conference for the 2002 season. In 2004, the team went 37–14 and tied for second in conference. It appeared in its first America East tournament and Mueller was named the conference's Coach of the Year.

Mueller led the program to its first NCAA tournament in 2007. After a 26–27 (13–11 America East) regular season, the Great Danes received the third seed in the 2007 America East tournament. There, they defeated Stony Brook in the opener and Binghamton twice to win the championship and the conference's automatic bid to the 2007 NCAA tournament. At the Fayetteville Regional, the team went 0–2, losing 9–0 to host Arkansas and 21–11 to second-seeded Creighton.

From 2000 to 2019, eight of Mueller's players have been selected in the Major League Baseball draft. The highest selection was Stephen Woods in 2016, an 8th-round selection of the San Francisco Giants.

== Head coaching record ==
Below is a table of Mueller's yearly records as a collegiate head baseball coach.

Record table
Season	Team	Overall	Conference	Standing	Postseason
Independent – DI (2000)
2000	Albany	19–24			
New York State Baseball Conference (2001)
2001	Albany	15–32	3–7	T–5th	
Albany:		15–32	3–7		
America East Conference (2002–present)
2002	Albany	20–30	8–14	T–6th	
2003	Albany	20–32	10–14	5th	
2004	Albany	37–14	14–7	T–2nd	America East tournament
2005	Albany	20–19	10–11	T–5th	
2006	Albany	20–32	12–10	4th	America East tournament
2007	Albany	29–29	13–11	3rd	NCAA Regional
2008	Albany	17–37–1	10–14	6th	
2009	Albany	26–31–1	15–9	2nd	America East tournament
2010	Albany	13–40	10–14	4th	America East tournament
2011	Albany	21–31	11–11	4th	America East tournament
2012	Albany	22–32–1	16–8	2nd	America East tournament
2013	Albany	23–25	16–14	3rd	America East tournament
2014	Albany	12–33	7–17	T–6th	
2015	Albany	14–28	7–13	6th	
2016	Albany	23–30	9–15	5th	America East tournament
2017	Albany	26–26	10–13	4th	America East tournament
2018	Albany	20–28	9–14	6th	America East tournament
2019	Albany	28–23	14–9	2nd	America East tournament
2020	Albany	7–5	0–0		Season canceled due to COVID-19
2021	Albany	22–25	20–18	1st (Division A)	America East tournament
2022	Albany	22–25	11–19	T–3rd (Division A)	America East tournament
2023	Albany	9–34–1	3–21	7th	
2024	Albany	15–34–1	10-13	5th	America East tournament
2025	Albany	22–32	10-14	5th	America East tournament
2026	Albany	15–35	9-15	6th	America East tournament
Albany:		537–766–5 (.412)	267–315 (.459)		
Total:		537–766–5 (.412)			
National champion Postseason invitational champion Conference regular season champion Conference regular season and conference tournament champion Division regular season champion Division regular season and conference tournament champion Conference tournament champion

== See also ==
- List of current NCAA Division I baseball coaches
- Albany Great Danes
