= Tim Sinicki =

American college baseball coach

Current position
- Title: Head coach
- Team: Binghamton
- Conference: America East
- Record: 930–924–9 (.502)

Biographical details
- Born: Johnson City, New York, U.S.
- Education: Western Carolina '88

Playing career
- 1985: Binghamton
- 1986: Broome CC
- 1987–1988: Western Carolina
- Position: Pitcher

Coaching career (HC unless noted)
- 1993–present: Binghamton

Head coaching record
- Overall: 930–924–9 (.502)
- Tournaments: NCAA: 1–15

Accomplishments and honors

Championships
- 7x America East Conference: 2007–2010, 2016, 2017, 2026 7x America East Conference Tournament: 2009, 2013, 2014, 2016, 2022, 2025, 2026

Awards
- 7× America East Coach of the Year: 2005, 2007, 2009, 2010, 2016, 2017, 2026

Timothy Sinicki is an American college baseball coach, who has been the head coach of the Binghamton Bearcats since the start of the 1993 season. Under Sinicki, Binghamton has appeared in two NCAA Division I Baseball Championships.

When Sinicki became Binghamton's head coach in 1993, the school competed in the NCAA Division III State University of New York Athletic Conference. Under Sinicki, the Bearcats moved to Division II for the 1999 and 2000 seasons and Division I at the start of the 2001 season. After spending 2001 in the New York State Baseball Conference, Binghamton joined the America East Conference for the 2002 season. The program made its first Division I postseason appearance in the 2005 America East tournament, where it was eliminated with consecutive losses to Northeastern and Vermont. From 2007–2010, Sinicki led Binghamton to four consecutive regular season America East titles. The team won the 2009 America East tournament to advance to its first NCAA tournament, where it won a game against George Mason. Binghamton appeared in its second NCAA tournament in 2013 after winning that season's America East tournament.

Sinicki played four seasons of college baseball for three different programs: Binghamton (1985), Broome CC (1986), and Western Carolina (1987–1988). A pitcher, Sinicki led Western Carolina in wins as a senior and appeared in both the 1987 and 1988 NCAA tournaments. He was drafted by the Pittsburgh Pirates in Major League Baseball's winter draft in 1986, but he chose to finish college rather than sign a professional contract.

== Head coaching record ==
Below is a table of Sinicki's yearly records as an NCAA head baseball coach.

Record table
Season	Team	Overall	Conference	Standing	Postseason
Binghamton Bearcats (State University of New York Athletic Conference (DIII)) (1993–1997)
1993	Binghamton	12–14	4–8	3rd (East)	
1994	Binghamton	17–15	7–5	2nd (East)	SUNYAC Tournament
1995	Binghamton	20–17	7–5	2nd (East)	ECAC Tournament
1996	Binghamton	19–16	6–6	2nd (East)	ECAC Tournament
1997	Binghamton	26–10–1	8–4	2nd (East)	ECAC Tournament
Division III:			32–28		
Binghamton Bearcats (Independent (DIII)) (1998–1998)
1998	Binghamton	14–18–1			
Division III:		108–90–2			
Binghamton Bearcats (New England Collegiate Conference (DII)) (1999–2000)
1999	Binghamton	17–22	8–10	6th	
2000	Binghamton	26–19	9–5	3rd	ECAC Tournament
Division II:		43–41	17–15		
Binghamton Bearcats (New York State Baseball Conference (DI)) (2001–2001)
2001	Binghamton	19–26–1	5–5	2nd	NYSBC Tournament
:		19-26-1	5-5		
Binghamton Bearcats (America East Conference) (2002–present)
2002	Binghamton	17–34	8–12	5th	
2003	Binghamton	10–40–1	2–20	7th	
2004	Binghamton	22–21	9–11	6th	
2005	Binghamton	23–26–1	12–8	4th	America East tournament
2006	Binghamton	27–23–1	12–11	5th	
2007	Binghamton	28–19	17–5	1st	America East tournament
2008	Binghamton	29–26	15–8	1st	America East tournament
2009	Binghamton	30–22	13–7	1st	NCAA Regional
2010	Binghamton	31–20	21–3	1st	America East tournament
2011	Binghamton	21–28	13–10	3rd	America East tournament
2012	Binghamton	23–26	13–9	3rd	America East tournament
2013	Binghamton	30–25	16–13	2nd	NCAA Regional
2014	Binghamton	25–27	11–12	4th	NCAA Regional
2015	Binghamton	17–24–2	6–16–1	7th	
2016	Binghamton	30–25	19–5	1st	NCAA Regional
2017	Binghamton	30–13	15–4	1st	America East tournament
2018	Binghamton	18–30–1	9–15	7th	
2019	Binghamton	26–24	12–9	3rd	America East tournament
2020	Binghamton	5–7	0–0		Season canceled because of COVID-19
2021	Binghamton	16–20	16–20	3rd (Division B)	
2022	Binghamton	22–30	15–15	2nd (Division B)	NCAA Regional
2023	Binghamton	29–23	12–12	T–3rd	
2024	Binghamton	21–29	10–14	6th	America East tournament
2025	Binghamton	29–26	13–11	T–3rd	NCAA Regional
2026	Binghamton	31–22	17–7	1st	NCAA Regional
Division I:		758–767–9 (.497)	306–257–1 (.543)		
Total:		930–924–9 (.502)			
National champion Postseason invitational champion Conference regular season champion Conference regular season and conference tournament champion Division regular season champion Division regular season and conference tournament champion Conference tournament champion

== See also ==
- List of current NCAA Division I baseball coaches
