= 2021 Stony Brook Seawolves baseball team =

American college baseball season

2021 Stony Brook Seawolves baseball

America East regular season champions
- Conference: America East Conference
- Record: 31–18 (25–10 America East)
- Head coach: Matt Senk (31st season)
- Assistant coaches: Jim Martin (4th season); Tyler Kavanaugh (4th season); Kyle Lombardo (3rd season)
- Home stadium: Joe Nathan Field

2021 America East Conference baseball standings
	Conf.				Overall
Team	W		L	PCT	W		L	PCT
Division A
Albany ^{x}‍‍‍	20	–	18	.526	22	–	25	.468
Maine ‍‍‍	16	–	17	.485	22	–	22	.500
UMass Lowell ‍‍‍	18	–	20	.474	19	–	28	.404
Hartford ‍‍‍	18	–	20	.474	18	–	20	.474
Division B
Stony Brook ^{x}‍‍‍	25	–	10	.714	31	–	18	.633
NJIT ‍‍‡‍^{y}	23	–	17	.575	27	–	23	.540
Binghamton ‍‍‍	16	–	20	.444	16	–	20	.444
UMBC ‍‍‍	12	–	26	.316	17	–	26	.395
x – Division champion ‡ – Tournament champion y – Invited to the NCAA tournament As of June 5, 2021; Rankings from D1Baseball

The 2021 Stony Brook Seawolves baseball team represented Stony Brook University during the 2021 NCAA Division I baseball season. The Seawolves played their home games at Joe Nathan Field as a member of the America East Conference. They were led by head coach Matt Senk, in his 31st year as head coach.

== Previous season ==
The 2020 Stony Brook Seawolves baseball team notched a 6–9 (0–0) regular-season record. The season prematurely ended on March 12, 2020, due to concerns over the COVID-19 pandemic.

== Game log ==
2021 Stony Brook Seawolves baseball game log
Regular Season (0–0)
February (0–0)

Date	Time (ET)	TV	Opponent	Rank	Stadium	Score	Win	Loss	Save	Attendance	Overall	Am. East

March (0–0)

Date	Time (ET)	TV	Opponent	Rank	Stadium	Score	Win	Loss	Save	Attendance	Overall	Am. East

April (0–0)

Date	Time (ET)	TV	Opponent	Rank	Stadium	Score	Win	Loss	Save	Attendance	Overall	Am. East

May (0–0)

Date	Time (ET)	TV	Opponent	Rank	Stadium	Score	Win	Loss	Save	Attendance	Overall	Am. East

Post-Season (0–0)
Am. East Tournament (0–0)

Date	Time (ET)	TV	Opponent	Rank	Stadium	Score	Win	Loss	Save	Attendance	Overall	Postseason

Legend: = Win = Loss = Canceled Bold = Stony Brook team member * Non-conference game • Schedule source • Rankings based on the teams' current ranking in the D1Baseball poll
