= Matt Senk =

American college baseball coach

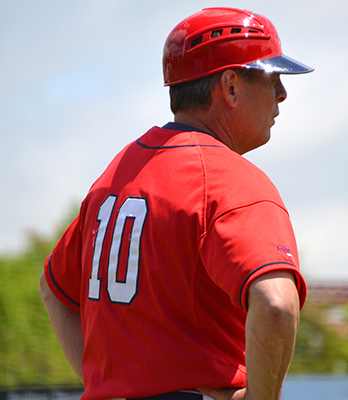
- Senk in 2014

Biographical details
- Education: Cortland State University; Adelphi University

Playing career
- 1977–1980: Cortland State
- Position: Catcher

Coaching career (HC unless noted)
- 198?: Elwood (NY) John Glenn (Asst.)
- 198?–1987: Rockville Centre (NY) Saint Agnes
- 1988–1990: Uniondale (NY) Kellenberg Memorial
- 1991–2025: Stony Brook

Head coaching record
- Overall: 971–696–4

Accomplishments and honors

Championships
- 6× America East Regular season Championships (2011, 2012, 2014, 2015, 2019, 2021); 6× America East Tournament championships (2004, 2008, 2010, 2012, 2015, 2019); NCAA Regional Champion (2012); NCAA Super Regional Champion (2012); College World Series Appearance (2012)

Awards
- America East Coach of the Year (2011, 2012, 2014); NCBWA National Coach of Year Award (2012)

Matt Senk is an American college baseball coach who served as the head coach of the Stony Brook Seawolves. Senk held the head coaching position at Stony Brook from 1991 until his retirement in 2025. Under Senk, Stony Brook has won America East Conference baseball tournaments in 2004, 2008, 2010, 2012, 2015, and 2019, appearing in the NCAA tournament each of those seasons. In 2012, Stony Brook won the Coral Gables Regional and advanced to the Baton Rouge Super Regional to face LSU. After defeating LSU in a three-game series, the team moved on to the College World Series for the first time in program history. It was the first time that a school from the Northeast had reached the College World Series since 1986.

Senk won the 2012 America East Conference Coach of the Year Award and went on to win the NCBWA National Coach of Year Award.

== Career ==
Senk graduated from John Glenn High School in 1976 and attended Cortland State for college, where he played catcher. In college, Senk started for three years and was a two-time All-SUNYAC selection and the team's Most Valuable Player in his senior year. He earned his master's degree in physical education at Adelphi University.

Senk coached high school teams at St. Agnes Cathedral and Kellenberg Memorial on Long Island before leaving his position to start coaching Stony Brook's Division III baseball team in 1991. Senk recruited shortstop Joe Nathan of Pine Bush, New York, to play for Stony Brook through a Pine Bush assistant coach that was a former college teammate of his. Nathan would become Senk's first recruit to reach the major leagues when he debuted for the San Francisco Giants as a pitcher in 1999.

In 2004, Senk won his first America East tournament to advance to the NCAA tournament regionals for the first time in the program's Division I history. Senk won his first America East Coach of the Year in 2011 after guiding the Seawolves to their first conference regular season championship and ending the season 42–12 while going 22–2 in conference play. In 2012, Senk guided the Seawolves to their fourth NCAA tournament regional after earning the most wins in the country; the Seawolves would win the Coral Gables Regional as the four-seed and then upset the LSU Tigers in the Baton Rouge Super Regionals to reach the first College World Series in program history, while also becoming the first Northeast school to accomplish the feat since 1986 and the first New York school since 1980. Finishing the season at 52–15, Senk won the NCBWA National Coach of the Year award.

In September 2019, Senk was given an extension through the 2024 season.

In 2022, Senk was inducted into the Suffolk County Sports Hall of Fame. The America East Conference suspended Senk for the first nine games of the 2022 season "in response to an incident that occurred during the 2021 season in which Coach Senk acted contrary to NCAA Baseball Rules and America East Bylaws governing conduct."

On March 8, 2023 with a 15–5 victory over LIU, Senk won his 900th game, becoming the seventh active Division I baseball head coach to win 900 games at one school.

On May 8, 2025, Senk announced that he will retire following the 2025 season after 35 years at Stony Brook.

== Head coaching record ==
Below is a table of Senk's yearly records as an NCAA head baseball coach.

Record table
Season	Team	Overall	Conference	Standing	Postseason
Stony Brook Patriots (Skyline Conference (Division III)) (1991–1994)
1991	Stony Brook	16–9			
1992	Stony Brook	17–12–1			ECAC Tournament
1993	Stony Brook	13–14–1	2-6	T-4th	
1994	Stony Brook	26–9	7-1	1st	ECAC Tournament
Stony Brook Patriots (Independent (Division III)) (1995–1995)
1995	Stony Brook	30–8			NCAA Regional
Stony Brook Seawolves (New England Collegiate Conference (Division II)) (1996–1998)
1996	Stony Brook	27–14	9-9		ECAC Tournament
1997	Stony Brook	15–19	9-7		
1998	Stony Brook	23–11–1	12-3-1		ECAC Tournament
1999	Stony Brook	36–12	12-4		ECAC Tournament
Stony Brook Seawolves (New York State Baseball Conference (Division I)) (2000–2001)
2000	Stony Brook	30–11			
2001	Stony Brook	35–16	10–0		
Stony Brook Seawolves (America East Conference) (2002–2022)
2002	Stony Brook	27–24	11–11	T–3rd	America East Tournament
2003	Stony Brook	33–21	15–9	3rd	America East tournament
2004	Stony Brook	29–27	11–10	4th	NCAA Regional
2005	Stony Brook	23–28	10–11	T–5th	
2006	Stony Brook	25–29	13–8	2nd	America East tournament
2007	Stony Brook	31–24	16–7	2nd	America East tournament
2008	Stony Brook	34–26	14–10	2nd	NCAA Regional
2009	Stony Brook	29–23	14–10	T–3rd	America East tournament
2010	Stony Brook	30–27	15–9	3rd	NCAA Regional
2011	Stony Brook	42–12	22–2	1st	America East tournament
2012	Stony Brook	52–15	21–3	1st	College World Series
2013	Stony Brook	25–34	15–15	4th	America East tournament
2014	Stony Brook	35–18	18–5	1st	America East tournament
2015	Stony Brook	35–16–1	18–4–1	1st	NCAA Regional
2016	Stony Brook	27–27	11–8	3rd	America East tournament
2017	Stony Brook	26–26	12–10	3rd	America East tournament
2018	Stony Brook	32–25	12–12	4th	America East tournament
2019	Stony Brook	31–23	15–9	1st	NCAA Regional
2020	Stony Brook	6–9	0–0		Season canceled because of COVID-19
2021	Stony Brook	31–18	25–10	1st (Division B)	America East tournament
2022	Stony Brook	27–25	21–9	1st (Division B)	
Stony Brook Seawolves (Colonial Athletic Association) (2023–2025)
2023	Stony Brook	23–29	14–16	7th	
2024	Stony Brook	24–28	12–15	T-8th	
2025	Stony Brook	25–27	11–16	T-8th	
Total:		971–696–4 (.582)	37–47 (.440)		
National champion Postseason invitational champion Conference regular season champion Conference regular season and conference tournament champion Division regular season champion Division regular season and conference tournament champion Conference tournament champion

== See also ==
- List of current NCAA Division I baseball coaches
