= Varsity Field =

Varsity Field may refer to:

- Varsity Field (Albany, New York), the University at Albany college baseball stadium
- Varsity Field (Binghamton, New York), the Binghamton University college baseball stadium

== See also ==
- Varsity Stadium, the University of Toronto college football stadium
- Varsity Stadium (Vancouver), the University of British Columbia's defunct multi-sport stadium in Vancouver
