= 2008 America East Conference baseball tournament =

American college baseball tournament

- Teams: 4
- Format: Double-elimination
- Finals site: Farmingdale State Baseball Stadium; Farmingdale, NY
- Champions: Stony Brook (2nd title)
- Winning coach: Matt Senk (2nd title)
- MVP: Steve Mazzurco (Stony Brook)

The 2008 America East Conference baseball tournament took place from May 22 through 24 at Farmingdale State Baseball Stadium in Farmingdale, New York. The top four regular season finishers of the league's seven teams qualified for the double-elimination tournament. In the championship game, second-seeded Stony Brook defeated first-seeded Binghamton, 6-0, to win its second tournament championship. As a result, Stony Brook received the America East's automatic bid to the 2008 NCAA tournament.

== Seeding ==
The top four finishers from the regular season were seeded one through four based on conference winning percentage only. They then played in a double-elimination format. In the first round, the one and four seeds were matched up in one game, while the two and three seeds were matched up in the other.

Team	W	L	Pct.	GB	Seed
Binghamton	15	8	.652	–	1
Stony Brook	14	10	.583	1.5	2
UMBC	13	11	.542	2.5	3
Vermont	12	11	.522	3	4
Hartford	10	13	.435	5	–
Albany	10	14	.417	5.5	–
Maine	8	15	.348	7	–

== Results ==
Upper round 1
1	Binghamton	4
4	Vermont	1
2	Stony Brook	4
3	UMBC	3
Lower round 1
4	Vermont	5
3	UMBC	1

Upper final
1	Binghamton	0
2	Stony Brook	1
Lower final
1	Binghamton	4
4	Vermont	0

Final
2	Stony Brook
1	Binghamton

== All-Tournament Team ==
The following players were named to the All-Tournament Team.

Player	Team
Gary Novakowski	Stony Brook
Justin Echeverria	Stony Brook
Steve Mazzurco	Stony Brook
Mike Errigo	Stony Brook
Zach Groh	Binghamton
Murphy Smith	Binghamton
Ryan Holley	Binghamton
Eric Thompson	Vermont
Matt Duffy	Vermont
Rich Conlon	UMBC

=== Most Outstanding Player ===
Stony Brook outfielder Steve Mazzurco was named Most Outstanding Player.
