= 2010 America East Conference baseball tournament =

American college baseball tournament

- Teams: 4
- Format: Double-elimination
- Finals site: Varsity Field (Binghamton baseball); Vestal, NY
- Champions: Stony Brook (3rd title)
- Winning coach: Matt Senk (3rd title)
- MVP: Pat Cantwell (Stony Brook)

The 2010 America East Conference baseball tournament took place from May 26 through 28 at Varsity Field in Vestal, New York. The top four regular season finishers of the league's six teams qualified for the double-elimination tournament. In the championship game, third-seeded Stony Brook defeated fourth-seeded Albany, 4–2, to win its third tournament championship. As a result, Stony Brook received the America East's automatic bid to the 2010 NCAA tournament.

== Seeding ==
The top four finishers from the regular season were seeded one through four based on conference winning percentage only. They then played in a double-elimination format. In the first round, the one and four seeds were matched up in one game, while the two and three seeds were matched up in the other.

Team	W	L	Pct.	GB	Seed
Binghamton	21	3	.875	–	1
Maine	17	7	.708	4	2
Stony Brook	15	9	.625	6	3
Albany	10	14	.417	11	4
Hartford	5	19	.208	16	–
UMBC	4	20	.167	17	–

== Results ==
Upper round 1
1	Binghamton	6
4	Albany	9
2	Maine	1
3	Stony Brook	10
Lower round 1
1	Binghamton	6
2	Maine	0

Upper final
4	Albany	4
3	Stony Brook	8
Lower final
4	Albany	7
1	Binghamton	4

Final
3	Stony Brook
4	Albany

== All-Tournament Team ==
The following players were named to the All-Tournament Team.

Player	Team
Pat Cantwell	Stony Brook
William Carmona	Stony Brook
Maxx Tissenbaum	Stony Brook
Nick Tropeano	Stony Brook
Adam Brown	Stony Brook
Kyle Crean	Albany
Brendan Rowland	Albany
Mike Augliera	Binghamton
Joe Charron	Binghamton
Joe Mercurio	Maine

=== Most Outstanding Player ===
Stony Brook catcher Pat Cantwell was named Most Outstanding Player.
