= 2016 America East Conference baseball tournament =

American college baseball tournament

- Teams: 6
- Format: Double-elimination
- Finals site: Edward A. LeLacheur Park; Lowell, Massachusetts
- Champions: Binghamton (4th title)

2016 America East Conference baseball standings
	Conf.				Overall
Team	W		L	PCT	W		L	PCT
Binghamton ‍†‍‡‍^{y}	19	–	5	.792	30	–	25	.545
Hartford ‍‍‍	14	–	9	.609	37	–	18	.673
Stony Brook ‍‍‍	13	–	9	.591	32	–	25	.561
UMBC ‍‍‍	13	–	10	.565	22	–	29	.431
Albany ‍‍‍	9	–	14	.391	23	–	30	.434
Maine ‍‍‍	8	–	15	.348	20	–	35	.364
UMass Lowell * ‍‍‍	5	–	19	.208	20	–	32	.385
† – Conference champion ‡ – Tournament champion y – Invited to the NCAA tournament Ineligible for league and NCAA tournaments due to transition from Division II; As of June 2, 2016; Rankings from Collegiate Baseball

The 2016 America East Conference baseball tournament was held from May 25 through 28, 2016. All six eligible participants out of the league's seven teams met in the double-elimination tournament to be held at Edward A. LeLacheur Park in Lowell, Massachusetts, the home park of UMass Lowell. Binghamton won the championship and received the conference's automatic bid to the 2016 NCAA Division I baseball tournament.

== Seeding and format ==
All six eligible teams were seeded one through six based on conference winning percentage only. The No. 1 and No. 2 seeds received a first-round bye. The teams then played a double-elimination tournament. UMass Lowell, despite hosting the event, was not eligible to participate as it was transitioning from Division II. The River Hawks are expected to complete this transition and be eligible for championships in the 2017–18 academic year.

Team	W	L	Pct	GB	Seed
Binghamton	19	5	.792	—	1
Hartford	14	9	.609	4.5	2
Stony Brook	13	9	.591	5	3
UMBC	13	10	.565	5.5	4
Albany	9	14	.391	9.5	5
Maine	8	15	.348	10.5	6
UMass Lowell	5	19	.208	14	—

== Bracket ==
First round Wednesday, May 25	Second round Thursday, May 26	Third round Friday, May 27	Championship; Saturday, May 28
1	Binghamton	6
4	UMBC	5	5	Albany	3
5	Albany	8	1	Binghamton	9
2	Hartford	6
2	Hartford	7
3	Stony Brook	1	3	Stony Brook	6
6	Maine	0
1	Binghamton	6
3	Stony Brook	3
Lower round 1	Lower round 2	Lower round 3	Lower final
2	Hartford	2
3	Stony Brook	10	3	Stony Brook	3
5	Albany	9	5	Albany	4
4	UMBC	1	6	Maine	8
6	Maine	11

== Schedule ==
All games were broadcast on AmericaEast.tv. Attendance is unknown.

Date	Game	Time*	Matchup^{#}
May 25, 2016	1	Noon	#4 UMBC vs. #5 Albany
May 25, 2016	2	3:30 p.m.	#3 Stony Brook vs. #6 Maine
May 25, 2016	3	7:00 p.m.	#4 UMBC vs. #6 Maine
May 26, 2017	4	Noon	#1 Binghamton vs. #5 Albany
May 26, 2017	5	3:30 p.m.	#2 Hartford vs. #3 Stony Brook
May 26, 2017	6	7:00 p.m.	#6 Maine vs. #5 Albany
May 27, 2017	7	Noon	#1 Binghamton vs. Winner Game 5
May 27, 2017	8	3:30 p.m.	#5 Albany vs. Loser G4/G5 (higher seed)
May 27, 2017	9	7:00 p.m.	Winner Game 8 vs. Loser Game 7
Saturday, May 28, 2016	10	Noon	Winner Game 7 vs. Winner Game 9
Saturday, May 28, 2016	11	3:30 p.m.	Winner Game 10 vs. Loser Game 10 (if necessary)

*Game times in EDT. # – Rankings denote tournament seed.
