= 2019 America East Conference baseball tournament =

American college baseball tournament

- Teams: 6
- Format: Double-elimination
- Finals site: Varsity Field; Vestal, New York
- Champions: Stony Brook (6th title)
- Winning coach: Matt Senk (6th title)
- MVP: Chris Hamilton ((Stony Brook))
- Television: AE TV (Wed-Fri); ESPN+ (Championship)

2019 America East Conference baseball standings
	Conf.				Overall
Team	W		L	PCT	W		L	PCT
Stony Brook ‍†‍‡‍^{y}	15	–	9	.625	31	–	23	.574
Albany ‍‍‍	14	–	9	.609	28	–	23	.549
Binghamton ‍‍‍	12	–	9	.571	26	–	24	.520
UMass Lowell ‍‍‍	12	–	12	.500	20	–	36	.357
Maine ‍‍‍	11	–	12	.478	15	–	34	.306
Hartford ‍‍‍	11	–	13	.458	23	–	34	.404
UMBC ‍‍‍	6	–	17	.261	22	–	30	.423
† – Conference champion ‡ – Tournament champion y – Invited to the NCAA tournament As of June 4, 2019; Rankings from D1Baseball

The 2019 America East Conference baseball tournament was held from May 22 to 25, 2019. The top six teams out of the league's seven members met in the double-elimination tournament held at Varsity Field in Vestal, New York, the home park of Binghamton. The tournament champion, Stony Brook, received the conference's automatic bid into the 2019 NCAA Division I baseball tournament.

== Seeding and format ==
The top six teams from the regular season were seeded one through six based on conference winning percentage only. The No. 1 and No. 2 seeds received a first-round bye. The teams then played a double-elimination tournament.

== Bracket ==
First round Wednesday, May 22	Second round Thursday, May 23	Third round Friday, May 24	Championship; Saturday, May 25
1	Stony Brook	7
4	UMass Lowell	5	4	UMass Lowell	6
5	Maine	0	1	Stony Brook	5
3	Binghamton	4
2	Albany	4
3	Binghamton	2	3	Binghamton	18
6	Hartford	1
1	Stony Brook	7	–
3	Binghamton	5	–
Lower round 1	Lower round 2	Lower round 3	Lower final
6	Hartford	5
2	Albany	3	3	Binghamton	10
4	UMass Lowell	4	6	Hartford	5
5	Maine	5	6	Hartford	6
6	Hartford	6

== Conference championship ==
America East Championship
(3) Binghamton Bearcats	vs.	(1) Stony Brook Seawolves

May 25, 2019, 1:00 pm (EDT) at Varsity Field in Vestal, New York
Team	1	2	3	4	5	6	7	8	9	R	H	E
(3) Binghamton	0	0	1	4	0	0	0	0	0	5	13	1
(1) Stony Brook	0	2	0	1	2	2	0	0	X	7	13	0
WP: Brandon Bonanno (3–1) LP: Nick Gallagher (4–5); Home runs: BING: Shane Marshall (6); SB: Michael Wilson (10); Brandon Alamo (4); Attendance: 954
