= Sinicki =

Sinicki (feminine: Sinicka) is a Polish surname. Notable people with the surname include:

- Christine Sinicki (born 1960), American politician
- Tim Sinicki (fl. 1993), American college baseball coach
