= 2013 America East Conference baseball tournament =

American college baseball tournament

- Teams: 4
- Format: Double-elimination
- Finals site: Edward A. LeLacheur Park; Lowell, Massachusetts
- Champions: Binghamton (2nd title)
- Winning coach: Tim Sinicki (2nd title)
- MVP: Jake Lambert (Binghamton)

2013 America East Conference baseball standings
	Conf.						Overall
Team	W		L		T	PCT	W		L		T	PCT
Maine ‍†‍‍	20	–	9	–	0	.690	37	–	22	–	0	.627
Binghamton ‍‍‡‍^{y}	16	–	13	–	0	.552	30	–	24	–	0	.556
Albany ‍‍‍	16	–	14	–	0	.533	23	–	25	–	1	.480
Stony Brook ‍‍‍	15	–	15	–	0	.500	25	–	34	–	0	.424
Hartford ‍‍‍	13	–	17	–	0	.433	17	–	36	–	0	.321
UMBC ‍‍‍	9	–	21	–	0	.300	18	–	30	–	0	.375
† – Conference champion ‡ – Tournament champion y – Invited to the NCAA tournament As of May 19, 2013; Rankings from Collegiate Baseball

The 2013 America East Conference baseball tournament was held from May 22 through 26. The top four regular season finishers of the league's six teams met in the double-elimination tournament held at Edward A. LeLacheur Park in Lowell, Massachusetts. This is the first year that the event was held at a predetermined neutral site since 2001. UMass Lowell, which would join the conference following the season and was a tenant of the park, served as the host of the tournament. Second-seeded Binghamton defeated first-seeded Maine in the championship game, which was played at Rhode Island's Bill Beck Field due to scheduling issues.

== Seeding and format ==
The top four finishers from the regular season were seeded one through four based on conference winning percentage only. The teams played a double-elimination tournament.

Team	W	L	Pct.	GB	Seed
Maine	20	9	.690	–	1
Binghamton	16	13	.552	4	2
Albany	16	14	.533	4.5	3
Stony Brook	15	15	.500	5.5	4
Hartford	13	17	.433	7.5	–
UMBC	9	21	.300	11.5	–

== Bracket ==
Upper round 1
1	Maine	7
4	Stony Brook	0
2	Binghamton	9
3	Albany	0
Lower round 1
4	Stony Brook	3
3	Albany	1

Upper final
1	Maine	2
2	Binghamton	10
Lower final
4	Stony Brook	1
1	Maine	3

Final
2	Binghamton
1	Maine

== All-Tournament Team ==
Player	Team
Austin Chase	Albany
Brandon McNitt	Stony Brook
Johnny Caputo	Stony Brook
Tommy Lawrence	Maine
Mike Connolly	Maine
Eric White	Maine
Daniel Nevares	Binghamton
David Schanz	Binghamton
Shaun McGraw	Binghamton
Jake Lambert	Binghamton

=== Most Outstanding Player ===
Jake Lambert, Binghamton
