= 2017 America East Conference baseball tournament =

American college baseball tournament

- Teams: 6
- Format: Double-elimination
- Finals site: Edward A. LeLacheur Park; Lowell, Massachusetts
- Champions: UMBC (1st title)

2017 America East Conference baseball standings
| | Conf. | | | | Overall |
| Team | W | | L | PCT | W | | L | PCT |
|---|---|---|---|---|---|---|---|---|
| Binghamton ‍†‍‍ | 15 | – | 4 | .789 | 30 | – | 13 | .698 |
| UMBC ‍‍‡‍^{y} | 11 | – | 9 | .550 | 23 | – | 25 | .479 |
| Stony Brook ‍‍‍ | 12 | – | 10 | .545 | 26 | – | 26 | .500 |
| Albany ‍‍‍ | 10 | – | 13 | .435 | 26 | – | 26 | .500 |
| UMass Lowell * ‍‍‍ | 10 | – | 13 | .435 | 22 | – | 26 | .458 |
| Maine ‍‍‍ | 8 | – | 12 | .400 | 25 | – | 29 | .463 |
| Hartford ‍‍‍ | 8 | – | 13 | .381 | 20 | – | 30 | .400 |
† – Conference champion ‡ – Tournament champion y – Invited to the NCAA tournament Ineligible for league and NCAA tournaments due to transition from Division II; As of June 30, 2017; Rankings from Collegiate Baseball

The 2017 America East Conference baseball tournament was held from May 24 to 27, 2017. All six eligible participants out of the league's seven teams met in the double-elimination tournament held at Edward A. LeLacheur Park in Lowell, Massachusetts, the home park of UMass Lowell and the minor league Lowell Spinners. UMBC won the tournament and received the conference's automatic bid into the 2017 NCAA Division I baseball tournament.

== Seeding and format ==
All six eligible participants from the regular season were seeded one through six based on conference winning percentage only. The No. 1 and No. 2 seeds received a first-round bye. The teams then played a double-elimination tournament. UMass Lowell, despite hosting the event, was not eligible to participate as it was transitioning from Division II. The River Hawks are expected to complete this transition and be eligible for championships in the 2017–18 academic year.

== Bracket ==
First round Wednesday, May 24 | Second round Thursday, May 25 | Third round Friday, May 26 | Championship; Saturday, May 27
1 | Binghamton | 3
4 | Albany | 3 | 4 | Albany | 7
5 | Maine | 0 | 4 | Albany | 0
2 | UMBC | 9
2 | UMBC | 3
3 | Stony Brook | 4 | 3 | Stony Brook | 2
6 | Hartford | 3
2 | UMBC | 2 | -
5 | Maine | 1 | -
Lower round 1 | Lower round 2 | Lower round 3 | Lower final
4 | Albany | 5
5 | Maine | 8 | 5 | Maine | 12
5 | Maine | 3 | 1 | Binghamton | 3
5 | Maine | 2 | 3 | Stony Brook | 0
6 | Hartford | 1
