= Murphy Smith =

American baseball player (born 1987)

- Pitcher
- Born: August 25, 1987 (age 39); Nashua, New Hampshire, U.S.
- Batted: Right Threw: Right

MLB debut
- August 27, 2018, for the Toronto Blue Jays

Last MLB appearance
- August 31, 2018, for the Toronto Blue Jays

MLB statistics
- Win–loss record: 0–0
- Earned run average: 8.10
- Strikeouts: 0
- Stats at Baseball Reference

Teams
- Toronto Blue Jays (2018)

Murphy Smith (born August 25, 1987) is an American former professional baseball pitcher who played in Major League Baseball (MLB) for the Toronto Blue Jays during the 2018 season.

== Career ==
Smith attended Shenendehowa High School in Clifton Park, New York, and Binghamton University, where he played college baseball for the Binghamton Bearcats. He was named All-America East Conference in 2009.

=== Oakland Athletics ===
The Oakland Athletics selected him in the 13th round (393rd overall) of the 2009 MLB draft. He played the 2009 season with the AZL Athletics, Vancouver Canadians, and Kane County Cougars. He spent the 2010 season with the Cougars and the Stockton Ports, and would also spend the 2011 season with Stockton. In 2012, he was assigned to the Midland RockHounds, where he would play the 2012, 2013, and 2014 seasons. Despite being named a Texas League All-Star in 2012 and 2013, he did not receive a call-up and was released by the Athletics organization on April 2, 2015.

=== Toronto Blue Jays ===
On April 14, 2015, Murphy signed a minor league contract with the Toronto Blue Jays organization. He finished 2015 with the Double–A New Hampshire Fisher Cats and the High–A Dunedin Blue Jays. He elected free agency on November 6.

On November 18, 2015, Smith re–signed with Toronto on a new minor league deal. That season, he earned his third career All-Star appearance, this time in the Eastern League, and made a late–season appearance for the Triple–A Buffalo Bisons. In 42 appearances out of the bullpen for New Hampshire, Smith compiled a 1.50 ERA with 68 strikeouts and 5 saves across 72 innings pitched. He elected free agency following the season on November 7, 2016.

Smith again re–signed with the Blue Jays on a minor league pact on December 12, 2016. Smith split the 2017 season between New Hampshire and Buffalo, accumulating a 3.68 ERA in 39 combined appearances before electing free agency on November 6.

On March 24, 2018, he again re–signed with the Blue Jays organization. After pitching for Buffalo in 2018, he was promoted to the major leagues for the first time on August 27, and debuted that day. He was designated for assignment on September 1. Smith elected free agency following the season on November 2.
