= 2009 America East Conference baseball tournament =

American college baseball tournament

- Teams: 4
- Format: Double-elimination
- Finals site: Pete Sylvester Field; Endicott, NY
- Champions: Binghamton (1st title)
- Winning coach: Tim Sinicki (1st title)
- MVP: Jim Calderone (Binghamton)

The 2009 America East Conference baseball tournament took place from May 21 through 23 at Pete Sylvester Field in Endicott, New York. The top four regular season finishers of the league's seven teams qualified for the double-elimination tournament. In the championship game, first-seeded Binghamton defeated second-seeded Albany, 16–6, to win its first tournament championship. As a result, Binghamton received the America East's automatic bid to the 2009 NCAA tournament, the program's first.

== Seeding ==
The top four finishers from the regular season were seeded one through four based on conference winning percentage only. They then played in a double-elimination format. In the first round, the one and four seeds were matched up in one game, while the two and three seeds were matched up in the other.

Team	W	L	Pct.	GB	Seed
Binghamton	13	7	.650	–	1
Albany	15	9	.625	–	2
Stony Brook	14	10	.583	1	3
Vermont	14	10	.583	1	4
Maine	13	11	.542	2	–
Hartford	7	15	.318	7	–
UMBC	4	18	.182	10	–

== Results ==
Upper round 1
1	Binghamton	10
4	Vermont	7
2	Albany	8
3	Stony Brook	1
Lower round 1
4	Vermont	13
3	Stony Brook	11

Upper final
1	Binghamton	11
2	Albany	7
Lower final
2	Albany	10
4	Vermont	9

Final
1	Binghamton
2	Albany

== All-Tournament Team ==
The following players were named to the All-Tournament Team.

Player	Team
Mike Augliera	Binghamton
Jim Calderone	Binghamton
Jeff Dennis	Binghamton
CJ Lukaszewski	Binghamton
David Kubiak	Albany
Dave West	Albany
Ryan Gugel	Albany
Dave Soltis	Vermont
Ethan Paquette	Vermont
Chad Marshall	Stony Brook

=== Most Outstanding Player ===
Binghamton second baseman Jim Calderone was named Most Outstanding Player.
