= Joe Nathan =

American baseball player (born 1974)

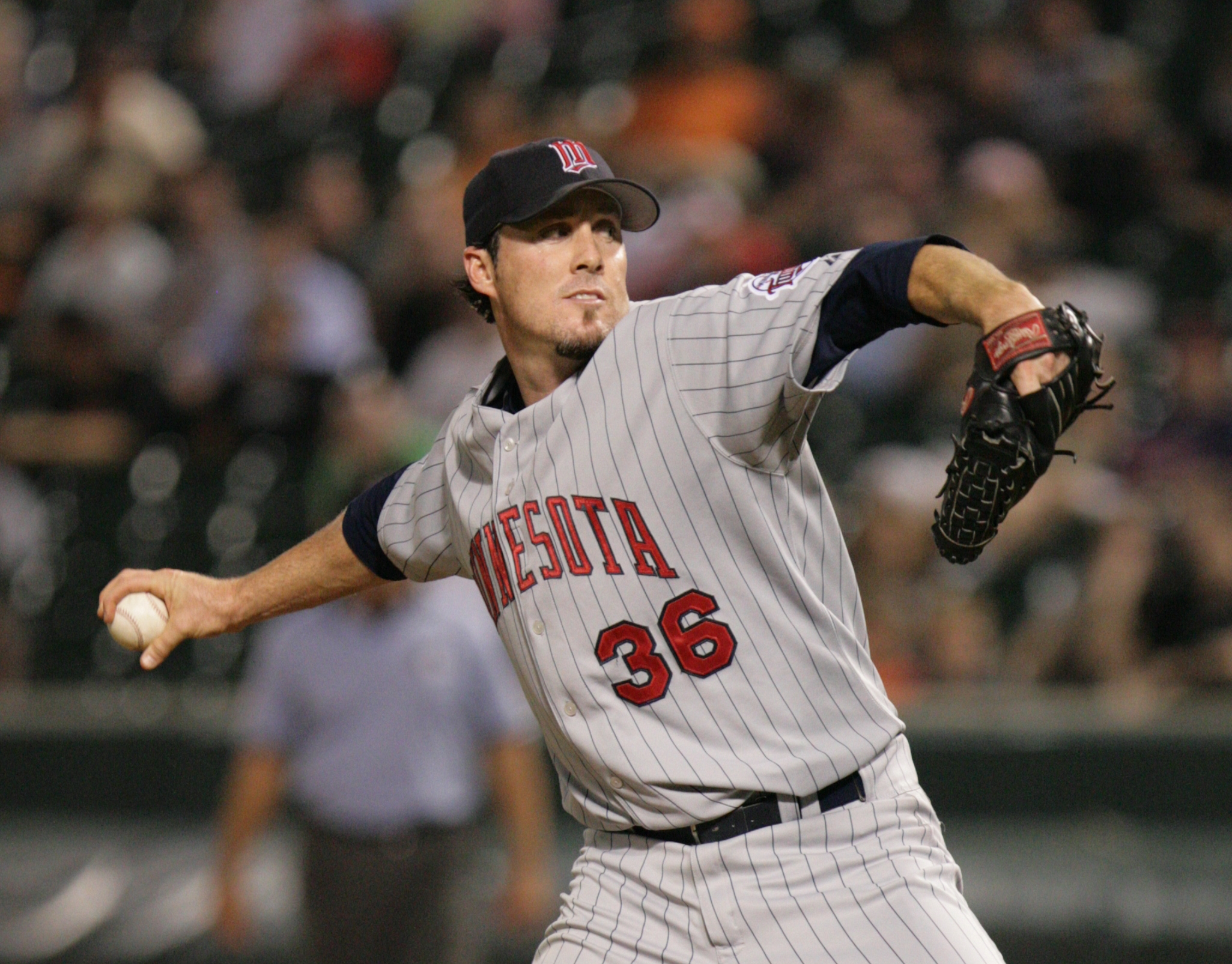
- Nathan with the Minnesota Twins in 2006
- Pitcher
- Born: November 22, 1974 (age 51); Houston, Texas, U.S.
- Batted: Right Threw: Right

MLB debut
- April 21, 1999, for the San Francisco Giants

Last MLB appearance
- September 27, 2016, for the San Francisco Giants

MLB statistics
- Win–loss record: 64–34
- Earned run average: 2.87
- Strikeouts: 976
- Saves: 377
- Stats at Baseball Reference

Teams
- San Francisco Giants (1999–2000, 2002–2003); Minnesota Twins (2004–2009, 2011); Texas Rangers (2012–2013); Detroit Tigers (2014–2015); Chicago Cubs (2016); San Francisco Giants (2016)

Career highlights and awards
- 6× All-Star (2004, 2005, 2008, 2009, 2012, 2013); AL Rolaids Relief Man Award (2009); Minnesota Twins Hall of Fame

Joseph Michael Nathan (born November 22, 1974) is an American former professional baseball pitcher. He played 16 seasons in Major League Baseball (MLB) for the San Francisco Giants, Minnesota Twins, Texas Rangers, Detroit Tigers, and Chicago Cubs. Nathan started out his baseball career as a shortstop in high school and in college for Stony Brook, but converted to a pitcher after being drafted by the Giants. He worked his way through the minor leagues, alternating between spots in the rotation and the bullpen.

When he debuted in 1999, he became the first player from Stony Brook to reach MLB. After a few years of splitting time between the major leagues and minor leagues, Nathan had a breakout season as a setup man for the Giants in 2003. That offseason, Nathan was traded to the Twins and became their closer. From 2004 to 2009, Nathan was considered one of the top closers in the major leagues, with four All-Star selections and a league-leading 246 saves. Nathan finished fourth in American League (AL) Cy Young voting in 2004 and fifth in 2006.

In 2010, Nathan underwent Tommy John surgery to repair a torn ulnar collateral ligament in his throwing elbow and missed the entire season. Nathan regained the role as closer in July 2011. On August 10, 2011, he became the Twins all-time leader in saves with his 255th in a game against the Boston Red Sox. After the 2011 season, Nathan left the Twins via free agency to sign with the Rangers, becoming an All-Star again in 2012 and 2013. On April 8, 2013, he earned his 300th save. After the 2013 season, Nathan signed with the Tigers. Nathan retired during the 2017 season with the eighth-most saves in MLB history.

Nathan currently has the highest save percentage in MLB history (89.13%) amongst pitchers with at least 200 saves. From a ten year span of 2003 to 2013, he was among the top three best relievers in terms of ERA+, ERA, WAR, and WHIP.

== Early career ==
Although born in Houston, Nathan moved with his family to Middletown, New York, when he was just two weeks old.

Nathan graduated from Pine Bush High School in Pine Bush, New York, in 1992, where he played basketball and baseball and ran track. Only Division III colleges showed minimal interest in him, and he ended up at Stony Brook University largely because his high school assistant coach Jeff Masionet and Stony Brook baseball coach Matt Senk knew each other as former teammates in the State University of New York at Cortland baseball program.

== College career ==
Nathan's retired No. 22 hanging on the bleachers at Joe Nathan Field in Stony Brook, New York

Nathan first played shortstop for the then Division III Stony Brook Patriots (now Division I and called the Seawolves) at Stony Brook University on Long Island, New York. He also played for the Fairfield Stallions in the New England Collegiate Baseball League in 1994. Nathan became a two-time Academic All-American and graduated as a member of the Golden Key International Honour Society. During his tenure at Stony Brook, professional baseball scouts began to notice his good arm and pitcher's body. Senk arranged for a game in front of scouts, but on a day that "literally someone from every organization" came to watch him pitch, the game was rained out. The scouts had to settle for watching Nathan in a throwing session. Nathan was drafted in the sixth round (159th overall) of the 1995 Major League Baseball draft by the San Francisco Giants and signed the next day, June 2.

In 2006, Nathan's number 22 was retired by Stony Brook, the first athlete to receive that honor from the school, and he was awarded the University Medal, the highest recognition given by Stony Brook. He was also inducted into the Stony Brook Hall of Fame in the class of 2006.

In August 2008, he gave the Stony Brook athletics department $500,000 for a new baseball facility. In recognition of this "lead gift" from the Joe Nathan Charitable Foundation, the college named their new baseball stadium Joe Nathan Field.

== Professional career ==
=== Minor Leagues ===
Nathan began his minor league career for the Single-A Bellingham Giants. After an unsuccessful year at the plate, the Giants tried to convert Nathan into a pitcher, but he refused and left to return to Stony Brook for a year, graduating with a degree in business management. He gave more thought to his future in baseball, however, and after graduation decided to return to the Giants organization and developed into a standout pitching prospect. After a season with the Salem-Keizer Volcanoes, he pitched for both the A and AA levels for (the San Jose Giants and Shreveport Captains) in 1998 as a starter. During his tenure with San Jose he started 22 games with an ERA of 3.32 and 118 strikeouts, leading the Class A Giants to the California League championship. Promoted to Double-A Shreveport in 1999, he pitched in only two games before being promoted to the parent club in 1999.

=== San Francisco Giants (1999–2003) ===
Nathan was promoted to the San Francisco Giants on April 20, 1999, taking the roster spot of superstar slugger Barry Bonds, who went on the disabled list after left elbow surgery. He made his major league debut the next day, pitching seven shutout innings and winning his first major league decision against the Florida Marlins, 4–0. He then divided the rest of the season between the Triple-A Fresno Grizzlies and the Giants. With the Grizzlies, he was 6–4 with a 4.43 ERA in 13 starts. In the majors, Nathan was 7–4 with one save and a 4.18 ERA in 19 games (14 starts) with the Giants. He earned his first career save on May 16 against the Houston Astros.

After a short stint in the minors in 2000, Nathan spent most of the season in the majors, finishing 5–2 with a 5.21 ERA in 20 games (15 starts), and even hitting two home runs. However, he struggled with his control, walking 63 batters in 93 1/3 innings. He was on the disabled list twice: from May 17 to June 6 for right shoulder tendinitis and from July 14 to August 18 for an inflamed right shoulder, necessitating arthroscopic surgery on the afflicted shoulder at the end of the season. Nathan divided 2001 between Triple-A Fresno and Double-A Shreveport both starting and relieving, finishing with a disappointing combined 3–11 record and an ERA of 7.29 in 31 games (17 starts). Nathan improved slightly in 2002 to 6–12 with a 5.60 ERA in 31 games (25 starts) with Fresno, but finally overcame his postsurgical struggles to return to the Giants in September with 3 2/3 scoreless innings in relief.

Nathan spent all of 2003 with the Giants in the bullpen after marrying Lisa Lemoncelli, his girlfriend of five years, in November 2002. This was a breakout year for Nathan, as he began the season with 23 scoreless innings. He finished the season with a 12–4 record and a 2.96 ERA in 78 relief appearances. His 78 appearances put him high on the list of most-used pitchers for the season as one of the best setup men in the NL, allowing no runs in 15 appearances from July 18 to August 20. His 12 wins in relief led the majors. The Giants won the National League West by 15 1/2 games and drew the Florida Marlins, the National League's wild card winner, in the NLDS. Nathan was hit hard in that series, blowing his only save opportunity in Game 2. His team fared no better, as they won Game 1 behind Jason Schmidt's complete game shutout before dropping the next three.

=== Minnesota Twins (2004–2011) ===
==== 2004 ====
Nathan was traded to the Minnesota Twins on November 16, 2003, along with pitchers Boof Bonser and Francisco Liriano for catcher A. J. Pierzynski and cash. The Twins decided to make Nathan their closer starting in 2004, a risky move considering that Nathan had notched only one save in six opportunities as a Giant, but he won the job over J. C. Romero and Jesse Crain in spring training. He was signed to a three-year deal on March 4, 2004, and agreed to an incentive-laden contract with a base salary of $440,000. He started off the season strong, allowing no runs in 20 appearances and earning 14 saves from April 15 to June 4. He was named AL Co-Player of the Week starting on May 10 with four saves in four innings and four appearances, facing the minimum number of batters each time. His credentials for the first half of the season, 23 saves in 24 opportunities with a 1.19 ERA in 26 appearances, earned him his first All-Star appearance in the 2004 MLB All-Star Game. He was the only Twin on the squad and pitched a perfect seventh inning, getting Bobby Abreu to strike out, Mike Lowell to fly out and Miguel Cabrera to strike out. His numbers were impressive through the rest of the season, allowing no runs between June 9 and August 18, and between August 25 and September 16. Nathan finished the season 1–2 with 44 saves in 47 opportunities and an ERA of 1.62 in 73 relief appearances. The Twins won the AL Central and faced the New York Yankees in the ALDS. Nathan picked up his first postseason save in Game 1, but blew his second opportunity in Game 2 as the Twins went on to lose the ensuing three games. His outstanding season earned him MVP and Cy Young votes, finishing fourth for Cy Young and 12th for MVP. His first child, a son named Cole, was born on November 9, 2004.

==== 2005 ====
During spring training in 2005, Nathan signed a two-year deal that includes a club option for 2008. He picked up from where he left off in 2004, allowing no earned runs in 15 appearances from April 5 to May 10. He also had streaks of 13 and 12 consecutive save opportunities converted between April and July. As a result, Nathan was named the American League Player of the Week for the week of June 27. Nathan earned another All-Star appearance in 2005 for his pitching in the first half of the season. Although his record was 1–3 with a 3.57 ERA in 37 appearances, he had struck out 43 batters in 35 1/3 innings pitched, and lead the AL with 23 saves in 25 opportunities. Nathan pitched in the 2005 MLB All-Star Game alongside fellow pitcher Johan Santana. Pitching the eighth inning of the game, he got Morgan Ensberg to pop out for the first out, then gave out a double to Moisés Alou. Felipe López singled, and Nathan was able to get Miguel Cabrera and Luis Castillo out, but not before Alou scored. Nathan had a brilliant second half as he went 6–1 with 18 saves in 20 chances, and posted an ERA of 1.76. He finished the season with a 7–4 record, a 2.70 ERA, 43 saves in 48 opportunities, and 94 strikeouts in 69 relief appearances. Nathan also became the third pitcher in club history to post consecutive 40 save seasons. The Twins, however, missed the playoffs.

==== 2006 ====
Before the 2006 season began, Nathan participated in the 2006 World Baseball Classic as one of the 30 players selected for the Team USA roster. He played the first game, a 2–0 win against Mexico, striking out the side while allowing one hit. He also pitched the 4–3 victory against Japan, again throwing a shutout inning. Nathan went on to pitch the last game for the United States in the ninth inning against Mexico, again not allowing a run and striking out two.

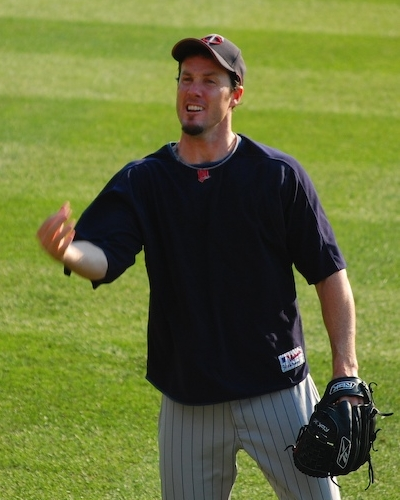
Nathan with the Twins in 2007

As the regular 2006 season began for the Twins, Nathan started off strong, allowing no runs from the start of the season to April 25. He also converted 10 straight save opportunities from April 11 to June 17. On June 24, Nathan recorded his 100th career save against the Chicago Cubs, and 99th save with Minnesota. Four days later he got save number 101, his hundredth save with Minnesota against the Los Angeles Dodgers, becoming the fifth pitcher in Twins history to achieve that mark. Despite putting up great numbers during the 2006 season, Nathan was not selected to the All-Star Game. He continued to pitch well throughout the season, passing Eddie Guardado for second on the Twins' all-time save list when he earned his 117th save against the Detroit Tigers on September 9. Nathan was also given the Major League Baseball Delivery Man of the Month award for July, going nine for nine in save opportunities and posting a 0.75 ERA for the month. He finished the season with some of his best numbers to date: a 7–0 record, a 1.58 ERA, 95 strikeouts, 36 saves, an 18th-place finish in MVP voting, and a fifth-place finish in Cy Young voting. His 61 games finished were also good for the AL lead and opponents batted just .158 against him, a career high. With 36 saves in 38 opportunities, Nathan also became the first pitcher for the organization to earn 35 saves in three straight seasons. The Twins won the division on the last day of the regular season, but were swept by the Oakland Athletics in the ALDS as Nathan made one scoreless appearance.

==== 2007 ====
Nathan continued as the Twins' closer for the 2007 season. He had a stretch between July and August where he gave up just two earned runs and converted all 12 save chances. Once again despite Nathan's numbers, he was not picked for the All-Star team. Nathan finished the year by converting 37 of 41 save opportunities with a record of 4–2 and an ERA of 1.88 in 68 relief appearances. The Twins, however, had a disappointing season and missed the playoffs.

On September 25, 2007, Nathan was named as one of 10 finalists for the "DHL Delivery Man of the Year Award", the third year in a row that he has been a finalist. On October 29, the Twins exercised Nathan's club option for 2008.

==== 2008 ====
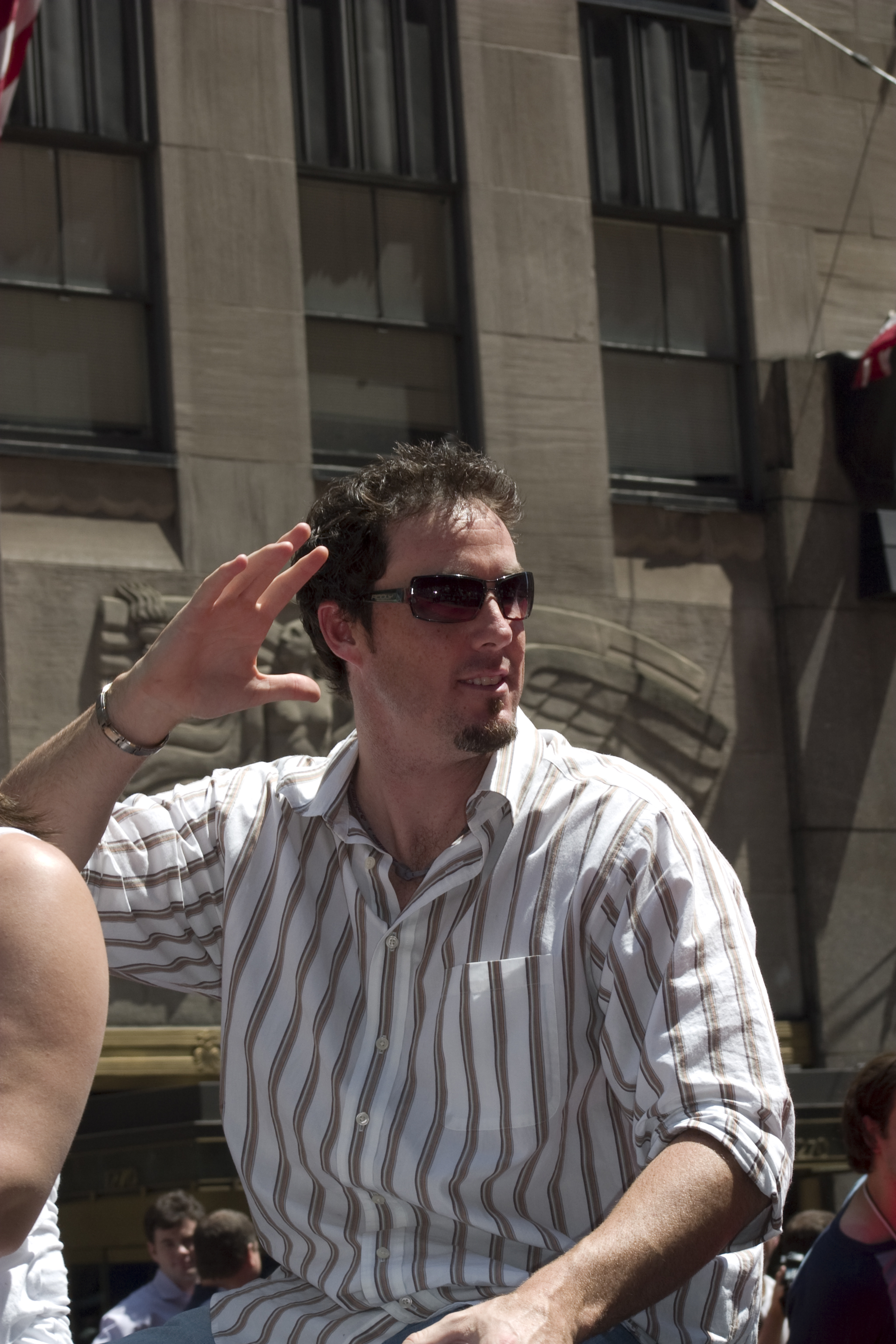
Nathan at the 2008 MLB All-Star Game Red Carpet Parade

Though Nathan was slated to make $6 million in 2008, on March 24, 2008, the Minnesota Twins re-signed Nathan to a four-year, $47 million contract through 2011. The deal also includes a $12.5 million club option for 2012 with a $2 million buyout.

Nathan started the season with 13 consecutive saves but blew his first save of the season on May 27 by giving up a three-run inside-the-park home run on a misplayed fly ball by teammate Delmon Young; however, Nathan got two outs to end the ninth inning and the Twins went on to win the game. By converting 27 of 29 save opportunities prior to the All-Star break, Nathan was selected as a reserve player for the American League in the 2008 Major League Baseball All-Star Game. He finished the season 1–2 with 39 saves and a career best 1.33 ERA in 68 relief appearances. He also had a career high six blown saves and surrendered his first career walk-off home run to Victor Martinez on September 16. Nathan ranked seventh in the majors in saves and had the lowest ERA of the top 30 save leaders in 2008.

==== 2009 ====
Nathan had a strong season, as he was selected as an All-Star for the 2009 MLB All Star Game, and he finished the year 2–2 with a 2.10 ERA and 47 saves in 52 opportunities, which was a franchise record. He shared honors for the AL Rolaids Relief Man award with Mariano Rivera. However, Nathan did not fare as well in the postseason; in Game 2 of the American League Division Series against the New York Yankees, with the Twins leading 3–1 in the bottom of the ninth inning, Nathan blew the save when he surrendered a game-tying two-run home run to Alex Rodriguez. It was the first home run Nathan had allowed with men on base all year. The Yankees later won the game in the 11th inning and swept the series. On October 11, 2009, after the Twins lost the final game at the Metrodome (a 4–1 playoff loss to the Yankees that eliminated them), Nathan took a pile of dirt from the mound as a keepsake from the Metrodome.

==== 2010 ====
On March 9, 2010, it was reported that Nathan had a tear in his ulnar collateral ligament. On March 21, after attempting to pitch without having surgery, Nathan decided to undergo Tommy John surgery, missing the entire 2010 season.

==== 2011 ====
Nathan earned his first save at Target Field on April 8, 2011. He emptied the container of dirt he took from the Metrodome on the mound at Target Field before pitching. On April 18, Nathan was replaced at closer by Matt Capps after going 3 for 5 in save opportunities. On May 28, 2011, Nathan was placed on the 15-day disabled list with a right flexor muscle strain. Chuck James was called up to take his place.

On August 10, 2011, against the Boston Red Sox, Nathan became the Twins all-time saves leader with 255, passing Rick Aguilera.

After the Twins declined his $12.5 million club option and exercised a $2 million buyout, Nathan became a free agent at the end of the 2011 season.

Nathan is currently the Minnesota Twins leader in career saves, with 260.

=== Texas Rangers (2012–2013) ===
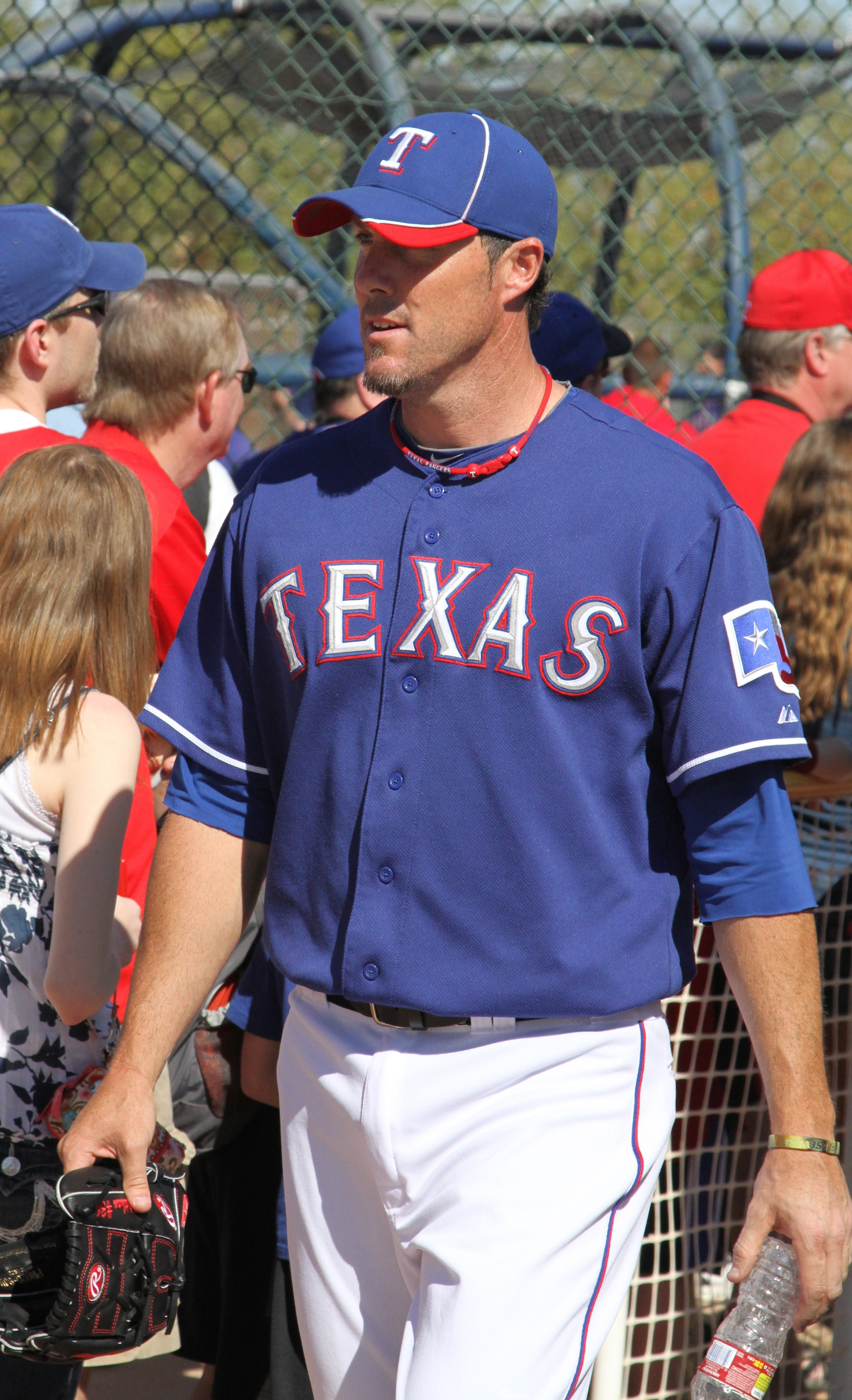
Nathan with the Texas Rangers in spring training, 2012

On November 21, 2011, Nathan agreed to terms on a two-year deal with the Texas Rangers worth $14.5 million guaranteed with an option for a third year at $9 million or a $500,000 buyout.

Nathan had a strong first season with the Rangers, as he was selected to the represent the Rangers at the 2012 MLB All-Star Game, the fifth All-Star selection of his career. He finished his 2012 campaign with a 3–5 record, 37 saves and an ERA of 2.80 in 66 relief appearances. During a game against the Tampa Bay Rays on April 8, 2013, Nathan earned his 300th career save after striking out Ben Zobrist looking on a controversial strike call made by home plate umpire Marty Foster. TV cameras captured Nathan saying "Wow!" after the call.

Nathan was selected to his sixth All-Star Game in 2013, and earned the save for the American League. Nathan improved on his 2012 campaign, finishing with a 6–2 record, 43 saves and an ERA of 1.39 in 67 games. Nathan finished his Rangers career with an overall record of 9–7, 80 saves, a 2.09 ERA and 0.98 WHIP.

=== Detroit Tigers (2014–2015) ===
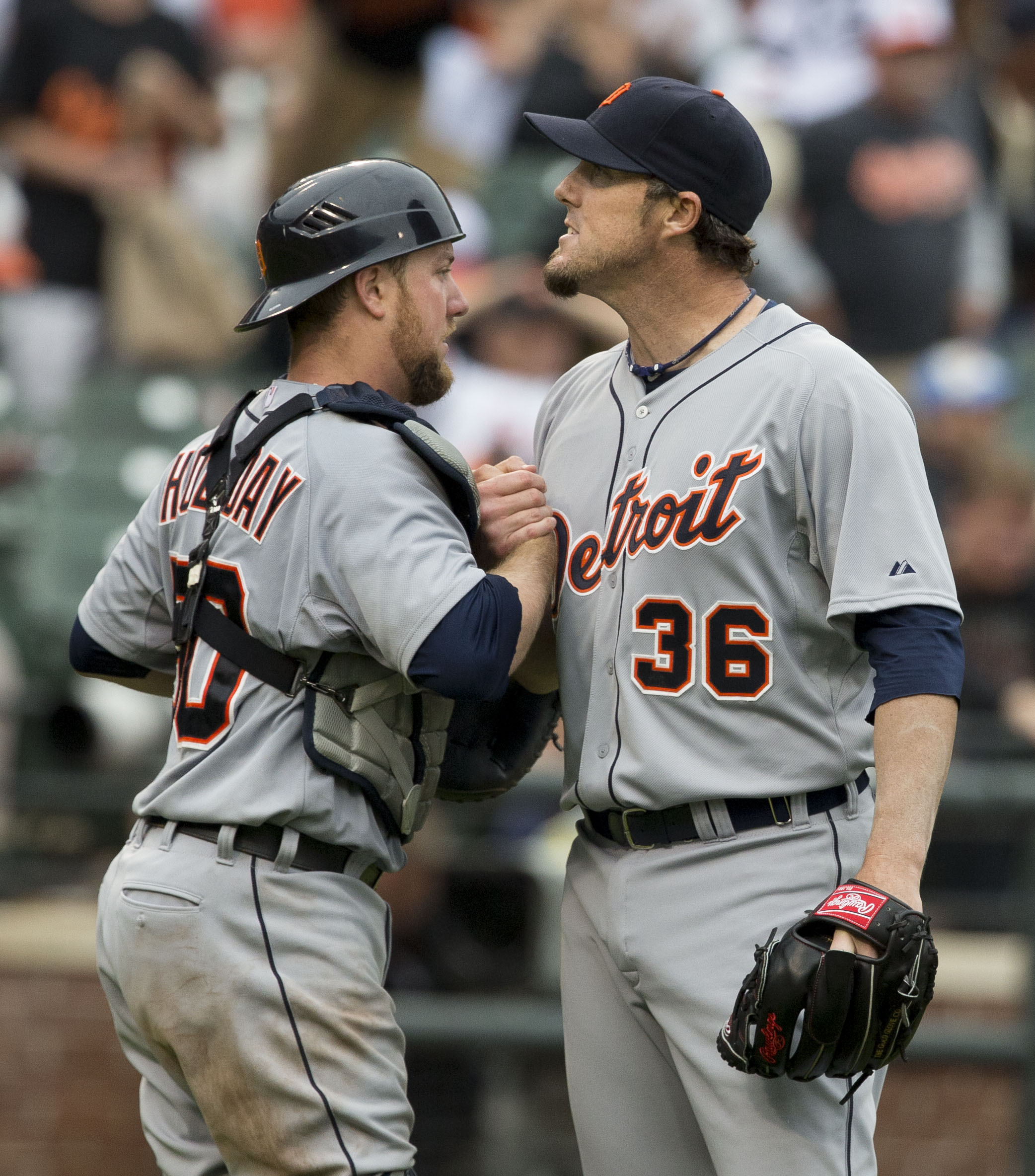
Nathan with the Detroit Tigers

On December 4, 2013, the Tigers signed Nathan to a two-year, $20 million contract, with a club option for 2016. This reunited him with former teammate and fellow ex-Twins great, Torii Hunter along with Rangers teammate Ian Kinsler. On May 5, 2014, Nathan recorded his 347th career save, tying him with Randy Myers for ninth on the all-time saves list. Two days later, Nathan recorded career save number 348, putting him alone at ninth on the all-time saves list. On July 9, Nathan recorded career save 358, tying him with Troy Percival for eighth on the all-time saves list. On August 23, 2014, Nathan recorded his 368th career save, passing up Jeff Reardon for seventh place on the all-time saves list. In a September 16 game against the Minnesota Twins, Nathan blew his seventh save of the season, surpassing his previous career high of six blown saves when he pitched for the Twins in 2008. Nathan finished his first season with the Tigers making 62 appearances and going 5–4 with 35 saves in 42 chances, while posting an ERA of 4.81. He made one postseason appearance in 2014, retiring all three batters he faced in a non-save situation in Game 2 of the ALDS against the Baltimore Orioles. The Tigers were swept in the series, 3–0.

On April 8, 2015, Nathan was placed on the 15-day disabled list due to a strained right elbow. During a rehab start with the Toledo Mud Hens on April 22, Nathan re-injured his elbow after throwing only 10 pitches. The same night, Nathan underwent MRIs, which tested positive revealing tears in his ulnar collateral ligament of the elbow and his pronator teres muscle, and would undergo Tommy John surgery, ending Nathan's 2015 season. Sources projected that this surgery could end Nathan's career, but he was not planning to retire yet.

During the 2015 offseason, the Tigers declined the $10 million club option for Nathan for the 2016 season, and exercised a $1 million buyout.

=== Chicago Cubs (2016) ===
On May 17, 2016, Nathan signed with the Chicago Cubs. He was immediately placed on the 60-day disabled list upon signing to continue recovery from his previous Tommy John surgery. He made his Cubs debut on July 24, 2016, against the Milwaukee Brewers, pitching one inning and striking out three while allowing one hit and one walk to earn the win. After three appearances, the Cubs designated Nathan for assignment on August 6, 2016. The Cubs went on to win the World Series that year, earning Nathan his first World Series ring.

=== Second stint with Giants (2016) ===
On August 16, 2016, Nathan signed a minor league deal with the San Francisco Giants. On September 3, Nathan was called up from the Triple-A Richmond Flying Squirrels to the Giants expanded September roster.

=== Washington Nationals ===
Nathan signed a minor league contract with an invitation to spring training with the Washington Nationals for the 2017 season. He opted out of his contract and was released on March 27, 2017, as spring training came to a close. He was re-signed to a minor league contract on April 9, and released for a second time on May 31.

=== Retirement ===
On September 3, 2017, Nathan held a press conference with the Minnesota Twins, where he announced his retirement after signing a one-day contract to end his career in Minnesota. Nathan threw out the first pitch during that night's game against the Kansas City Royals. Nathan retired with 377 saves, at the time eighth-most in MLB history, a 2.87 ERA, and an 89.3% save percentage, the highest amongst all relievers with at least 250 saves.

Nathan was inducted into the Twins Hall of Fame on August 3, 2019.

== Records and notable statistics ==
Nathan was included on the ballot for the National Baseball Hall of Fame class of 2022 when it was announced on November 22, 2021. He received 17 votes (4.3% of all votes cast) and was eliminated from future consideration by the writers.

MLB
Accomplishment	Record	Refs
Regular season
Highest save percent (SV/SVO) in MLB history (minimum 200 completed saves) (Note: As of July 7, 2014, followed by Mariano Rivera 89.07%, Trevor Hoffman 88.77%, Jonathan Papelbon 88.00%, José Valverde 87.80%)	89.33%	
Second-most saves in AL history (Note: 2nd to Mariano Rivera)	374	
Third-most seasons with at least 35 saves (Note: Only behind Mariano Rivera and Trevor Hoffman)	9 (2004–2009, 2012–2014)	
Tied for third-most seasons with at least 40 saves (Note: Tied with Dennis Eckersley, Francisco Rodríguez, John Wetteland, José Mesa, and Robb Nen)	4 (2004, 2005, 2009, 2013)	
Second-most seasons with sub-1.89 ERA (minimum 60 innings pitched each) (Note: Only behind Mariano Rivera)	5 (2004, 2005, 2009, 2013)	
Tied for most seasons with at least 35 saves, sub-1.89 ERA, and sub-1.00 WHIP (minimum 60 innings pitched each) (Note: Tied with Mariano Rivera and Billy Wagner)	4 (2004, 2005, 2009, 2013)	

Twins records
Accomplishment	Record	Refs
Regular season
Most career games saved	260	
Most saves in single season	47 (2009)	
Highest career strikeout-to-walk ratio (minimum 450 innings pitched)	4.19	
Lowest career WHIP (minimum 450 innings pitched)	0.96	
Most consecutive save opportunities converted	27	

== Personal life ==
Nathan met his wife, Lisa, in Arizona in 1997. Together, they had a son named Cole in or around 2005 and a daughter named Riley Grace in April 2007.

Nathan's grandfather, Bob Brock, was a star baseball player for the Texas Longhorns and played briefly in the Boston Red Sox farm system.

== Pitching style ==
Nathan threw a mix of four pitches. His main pitch, a four-seam fastball was once thrown in the mid-to-upper 90s, but settled between 91 and 94 mph. His main breaking ball was a hard slider in the upper 80s, occasionally even touching 90. He used the slider less frequently against left-handed hitters, preferring to use a curveball in the low 80s. He also used a two-seam fastball against lefties. His slider was his best swing-and-miss pitch, with a whiff rate of 42% since 2007.

== See also ==
- List of Major League Baseball career saves leaders
