= 2021 America East Conference baseball tournament =

American college baseball tournament

- Joe Nathan Field, Stony Brook
- Teams: 4
- Format: Double-elimination
- Finals site: Joe Nathan Field; Stony Brook, New York
- Champions: New Jersey Institute of Technology (1st title)
- Winning coach: Robbie McClellan
- MVP: Not Awarded ()

2021 America East Conference baseball standings
	Conf.				Overall
Team	W		L	PCT	W		L	PCT
Division A
Albany ^{x}‍‍‍	20	–	18	.526	22	–	25	.468
Maine ‍‍‍	16	–	17	.485	22	–	22	.500
UMass Lowell ‍‍‍	18	–	20	.474	19	–	28	.404
Hartford ‍‍‍	18	–	20	.474	18	–	20	.474
Division B
Stony Brook ^{x}‍‍‍	25	–	10	.714	31	–	18	.633
NJIT ‍‍‡‍^{y}	23	–	17	.575	27	–	23	.540
Binghamton ‍‍‍	16	–	20	.444	16	–	20	.444
UMBC ‍‍‍	12	–	26	.316	17	–	26	.395
x – Division champion ‡ – Tournament champion y – Invited to the NCAA tournament As of June 5, 2021; Rankings from D1Baseball

The 2021 America East Conference baseball tournament was held from May 27 to May 30, 2021. The top four teams out of the league's eight members met in the double-elimination tournament held at Joe Nathan Field in Stony Brook, New York. The tournament champion, New Jersey Institute of Technology, received the conference's automatic bid into the 2021 NCAA Division I baseball tournament.

== Bracket ==
First round
A2	Maine	4
A2	Stony Brook	2
B2	NJIT	5
B1	UAlbany	4
Lower round 1
B1	Stony Brook	3
A1	UAlbany	2

Second round
B2	NJIT	2
A2	Maine	1
Lower final
B1	Stony Brook	15
A2	Maine	9

Championship
B2	NJIT
B1	Stony Brook

== Conference championship ==
There was no championship game held in 2021. Per conference policy, NJIT received the league's automatic bid to the NCAA tournament as the lone unbeaten team in the championship after the remainder of the 2021 America East Conference Championship was unable to be completed due to inclement weather.
