= Varsity Stadium (Vancouver) =

Former sports stadium in Vancouver, Canada

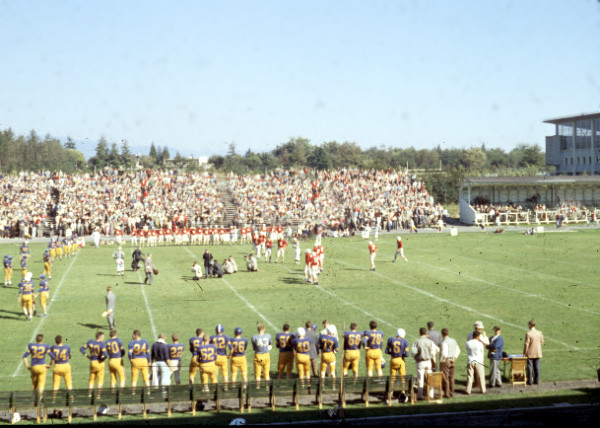
- UBC vs. McGill, September 1955 at Varsity Stadium (north view from the south grandstand)
- Interactive map of Varsity Stadium
- Full name: Varsity Stadium
- Former names: UBC Stadium
- Location: East Mall - location of today's Student Union Building; University Endowment Lands, near Vancouver, British Columbia, Canada
- Coordinates: 49.267°N 123.251°W
- Owner: University of British Columbia
- Operator: UBC Athletic Department
- Capacity: 3,500 (est.)
- Surface: Grass

Construction
- Groundbreaking: 1937
- Built: 1937-38
- Opened: October 1, 1938
- Renovated: For the 1954 British Empire Games
- Expanded: 1954
- Closed: Fall, 1967
- Demolished: 1968
- Cost: $40,000
- Architects: Sharp & Thompson

Tenant
- UBC Thunderbirds

Varsity Stadium (also referred to as "UBC Stadium" during the 1950s and "Old Stadium" post-demolition) was an outdoor stadium on the University Endowment Lands of British Columbia, west of Vancouver's city limits. It was used primarily for soccer, rugby union and football by the University of British Columbia Thunderbirds. Playing fields were built on the site in 1931 funded by labour subscriptions by the Faculty Association, AMS and UBC Board of Governors for a cost of $14,298. The UBC AMS contributed the entire $40,000 to build the grandstand in 1937.

It was opened October 1, 1938 with a Canadian Football game between the UBC Thunderbirds and the Vancouver Meralomas.

The stadium was upgraded in 1954 to serve as practice facility for the British Empire and Commonwealth Games.

The stadium was located beside UBC's War Memorial Gym until it was replaced by Thunderbird Stadium in 1967, and demolished in 1968 to make way for the Student Union Building.

Notable events included a visit from Princess Elizabeth and Prince Philip who witnessed a "Canadian gridiron game" between UBC and Southern Oregon University in October 1958. The Royal party was late to arrive at the game. The motorcade arrived at the conclusion of the game, so the teams staged an additional 10-minute exhibition for the Royal party in the dark, as the stadium did not have lights.

The Churchill Bowl was staged as an invitational pre-season national championship in 1959 when UBC lost 34–7 to the Western Mustangs.
