= Varsity Field (Albany, New York) =

Sports field in New York State

- Interactive map of Varsity Field
- Location: University of Albany Campus; SUNY Campus Road, Albany, New York, USA
- Coordinates: 42.678898°N 73.823962°W
- Owner: University at Albany, SUNY
- Operator: University at Albany, SUNY
- Scoreboard: Electronic
- Field size: Left field: 330 feet (100 m); Center field: 400 feet (120 m); Right field: 330 feet (100 m)

Construction
- Renovated: 2004

Tenant
- Albany Great Danes baseball (NCAA D1 AEC)

Varsity Field is a baseball field located on the campus of the University at Albany in Albany, New York, United States. The field is home to the Albany Great Danes baseball team of the NCAA Division I America East Conference. The facility shares its name with the university's soccer facility. The field hosted the school's inaugural Division I baseball game on March 24, 2000, in which the Great Danes defeated the Canisius Golden Griffins 9–1.

== Renovations ==
The field underwent renovations prior to the 2004 season. Improvements included a new fence, new foul poles, bullpens, and batting cages. A new scoreboard was also added following the 2004 season.

== See also ==
- List of NCAA Division I baseball venues
