= 2011 America East Conference baseball tournament =

American college baseball tournament

- Teams: 4
- Format: Double-elimination
- Finals site: Joe Nathan Field; Stony Brook, NY
- Champions: Maine (5th title)
- Winning coach: Steve Trimper (2nd title)
- MVP: Taylor Lewis (Maine)

The 2011 America East Conference baseball tournament took place from May 25 through 27 at Joe Nathan Field in Stony Brook, New York. The top four regular season finishers of the league's six teams qualified for the double-elimination tournament. In the championship game, second-seeded Maine defeated fourth-seeded Albany, 10-1, to win its fifth tournament championship (its second under head coach Steve Trimper). As a result, Maine received the America East's automatic bid to the 2011 NCAA tournament.

== Seeding ==
The top four finishers from the regular season were seeded one through four based on conference winning percentage only. They then played in a double-elimination format. In the first round, the one and four seeds were matched up in one game, while the two and three seeds were matched up in the other.

Team	W	L	Pct.	GB	Seed
Stony Brook	22	2	.917	–	1
Maine	18	6	.750	4	2
Binghamton	13	10	.565	8.5	3
Albany	11	11	.500	10	4
Hartford	3	20	.130	18.5	–
UMBC	2	20	.091	19	–

== Results ==
Upper round 1
1	Stony Brook	14
4	Albany	2
2	Maine	4
3	Binghamton	3
Lower round 1
4	Albany	4
3	Binghamton	1

Upper final
1	Stony Brook	1
2	Maine	8
Lower final
1	Stony Brook	1
4	Albany	4

Final
2	Maine
4	Albany

== All-Tournament Team ==
The following players were named to the All-Tournament Team.

Player	Team
Keith Bilodeau	Maine
Alex Calbick	Maine
Mike Fransoso	Maine
Taylor Lewis	Maine
Kasceim Graham	Albany
Zach Kraham	Albany
Ralph Rizzo	Albany
Steve Marino	Stony Brook
Nick Tropeano	Stony Brook
James Giulietti	Binghamton

=== Most Outstanding Player ===
Maine outfielder Taylor Lewis was named Most Outstanding Player.
