= 2007 America East Conference baseball tournament =

American college baseball tournament

- Teams: 4
- Format: Double-elimination
- Finals site: Farmingdale State Baseball Stadium; Farmingdale, NY
- Champions: Albany (1st title)
- Winning coach: Jon Mueller (1st title)
- MVP: Cory Warring (Albany)

The 2007 America East Conference baseball tournament took place from May 24 through 26 at Farmingdale State Baseball Stadium in Farmingdale, New York. The top four regular season finishers of the league's seven teams qualified for the double-elimination tournament. In the championship game, third-seeded Albany defeated first-seeded Binghamton, 1-0, to win its first tournament championship. As a result, Albany received the America East's automatic bid to the 2007 NCAA tournament, the program's first.

== Seeding ==
The top four finishers from the regular season were seeded one through four based on conference winning percentage only. They then played in a double-elimination format. In the first round, the one and four seeds were matched up in one game, while the two and three seeds were matched up in the other.

Team	W	L	Pct.	GB	Seed
Binghamton	17	5	.773	–	1
Stony Brook	16	7	.696	1.5	2
Albany	13	11	.542	5	3
Maine	12	11	.522	5.5	4
Vermont	10	13	.435	7.5	–
Hartford	9	14	.391	8.5	–
UMBC	4	20	.167	14	–

== Results ==
Upper round 1
1	Binghamton	9
4	Maine	3
2	Stony Brook	2
3	Albany	5
Lower round 1
4	Maine	13
2	Stony Brook	8

Upper final
1	Binghamton	7
3	Albany	8
Lower final
1	Binghamton	13
4	Maine	4

Final
3	Albany
1	Binghamton

== All-Tournament Team ==
The following players were named to the All-Tournament Team.

Player	Team
Sean Donovan	Albany
John Naples	Albany
Cory Warring	Albany
Steve Wyland	Albany
Ryan James	Binghamton
Henry Dunn	Binghamton
Matt Simek	Binghamton
Billy Cather	Maine
Curt Smith	Maine
Rob Leonard	Stony Brook

=== Most Outstanding Player ===
Albany pitcher Cory Warring was named Most Outstanding Player.
