= Albany Great Danes baseball =

American college baseball team

Albany Great Danes
- 2026 Albany Great Danes baseball
- University: University at Albany
- Head coach: Jon Mueller (27th season)
- Conference: America East
- Location: Albany, New York
- Home stadium: Varsity Field
- Nickname: Great Danes
- Colors: Purple and gold

NCAA tournament appearances
- 2007

Conference tournament champions
- 2007

The Albany Great Danes baseball team is a varsity intercollegiate athletic team of the University at Albany in Albany, New York, United States. The team is a member of the America East Conference, which is part of the National Collegiate Athletic Association's Division I. It plays home games at Varsity Field on the university's campus in Albany, New York. The Great Danes are coached by Jon Mueller.

== History ==
Albany's baseball program played its first season in 1958. After spending several decades in Division III, it began the transition to Division I in the mid-1990s along with the school's other teams.

=== Division I ===
It played its first season in Division I in 2000, also hiring head coach Jon Mueller that year. After competing as an independent in 2000 and in the New York State Baseball Conference in 2001, it played its first season in the America East in 2002. In 2004, the Great Danes set a program record with 37 wins and reached their first Division I postseason, going 1–2 at that season's America East tournament. In 2007, the team won the AEC tournament as the third seed to reach its first NCAA tournament at any level. As the fourth seed at the Fayetteville Regional, Albany went 0–2, losing 9–0 to host Arkansas and 21–11 to second seed Creighton.

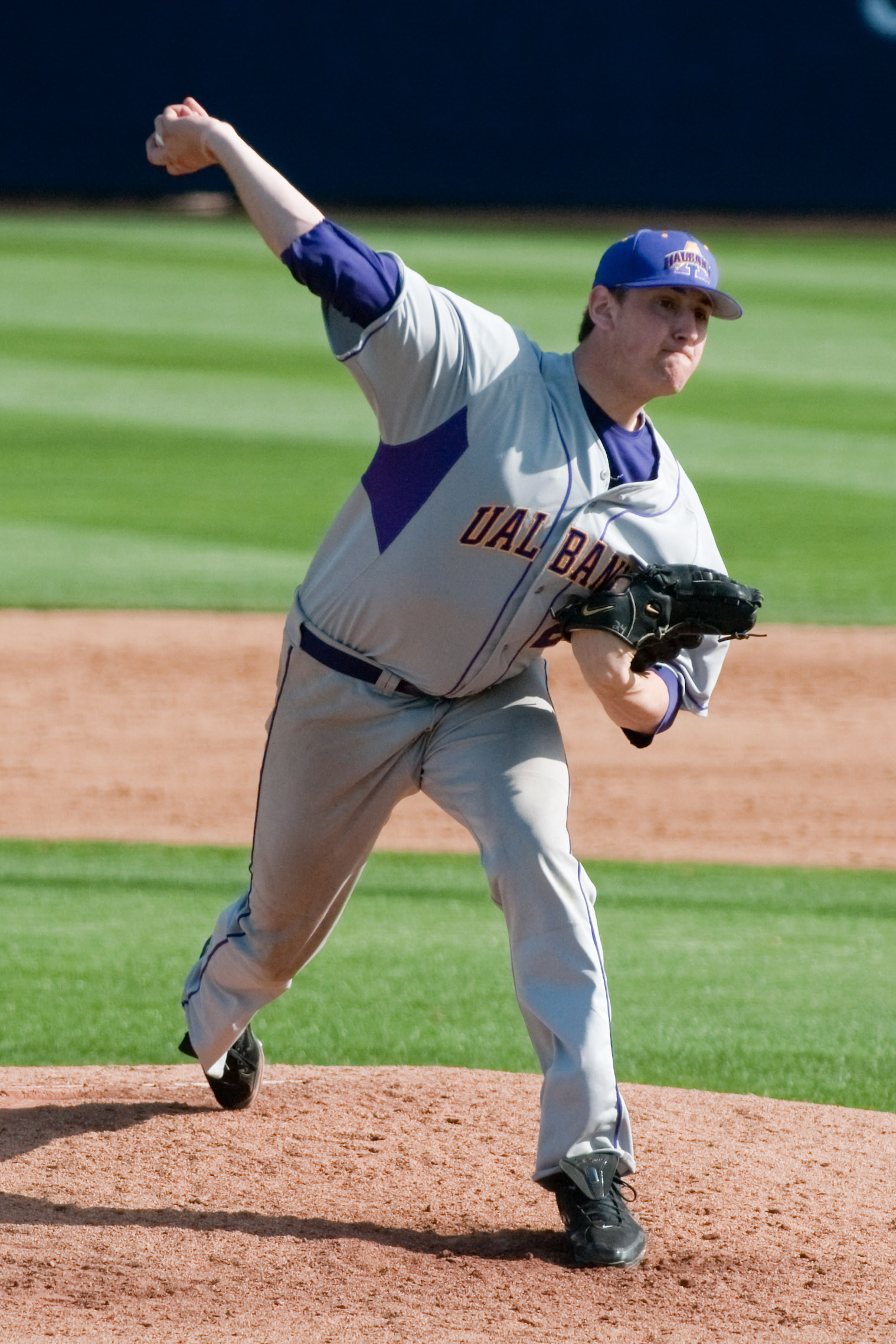
A Great Danes pitcher at George C. Page Stadium in 2010

== NCAA Tournament ==
Albany has participated in the NCAA Division I baseball tournament once. They have a record of 0–2.

Year	Region	Round	Opponent	Result
2007	Louisville Regional	First Round; Lower Round 1	Arkansas; Creighton	L 0–9; L 11–21

== Year-by-year results ==
Below is a table of Albany's yearly records as an NCAA Division I baseball program.

Record table
Season	Coach	Overall	Conference	Standing	Postseason
Independent (1958)
1958	Doc Sauers	6–8			
NYSIAC/SUNYAC (Note: The SUNYAC was known as the New York State Intercollegiate Athletic Conference (NYSIAC) from 1959 to 1963.) – College/DIII (1959–1995)
1959	Doc Sauers	6–10			
1960	Bob Burlingame	7–8			
1961	Bob Burlingame	9–5			
1962	Bob Burlingame	6–10			
1963	Bob Burlingame	6–5			
1964	Bob Burlingame	5–8			
1965	Bob Burlingame	5–9			
1966	Bob Burlingame	3–10			
1967	Bob Burlingame	6–9–1			
1968	Bob Burlingame	7–10			
1969	Bob Burlingame	11–6			
1970	Bob Burlingame	8–11			
1971	Bob Burlingame	9–4–1			
1972	Bob Burlingame	8–7–1			
1973	Bob Burlingame	8–7			
1974	Bob Burlingame	7–11			
1975	Bob Burlingame	6–13			
1976	Bob Burlingame	10–13–1			
1977	Bob Burlingame	15–8			
1978	Bob Burlingame	9–9–2			
1979	Bob Burlingame	12–14			
1980	Richard Skeel	7–12			
1981 (Note: Records unavailable.)	Richard Skeel				
1982	Mark Collins	9–10			
1983	David Haight				
1984	Ed Zaloom	11–12–1			
1985	Ed Zaloom	12–13–1			
1986	Ed Zaloom	17–9			
1987	Ed Zaloom	18–9			
1988	Ed Zaloom	9–11			
1989	Ed Zaloom	8–13			
1990	Ed Zaloom	4–11			
1991	Ed Zaloom	12–12			
1992	Ed Zaloom	14–11			
1993	Ed Zaloom	11–7			
1994	Ed Zaloom	13–11			
1995	Doug O'Brey	9–21			
NYSIAC/SUNYAC:		317–349–8			
New England Collegiate Conference – DII (1996–1999)
1996	Doug O'Brey	14–22–1			
1997	Doug O'Brey	19–17			
1998	Doug O'Brey	19–15			
1999	Doug O'Brey	21–21			ECAC Tournament
NECC:		73–75–1			
Independent – DI (2000)
2000	Jon Mueller	19–24			
New York State Baseball Conference (2001)
2001	Jon Mueller	15–32	3–7	t-5th	
America East Conference (2002–present)
2002	Jon Mueller	20–30	8–14	t-6th	
2003	Jon Mueller	20–32	10–14	5th	
2004	Jon Mueller	37–14	14–7	t-2nd	America East tournament
2005	Jon Mueller	20–19	10–11	t-5th	
2006	Jon Mueller	20–32	12–10	4th	America East tournament
2007	Jon Mueller	29–29	13–11	3rd	NCAA Regional
2008	Jon Mueller	17–37–1	10–14	6th	
2009	Jon Mueller	26–31–1	15–9	2nd	America East tournament
2010	Jon Mueller	13–40	10–14	4th	America East tournament
2011	Jon Mueller	21–31	11–11	4th	America East tournament
2012	Jon Mueller	22–32–1	16–8	2nd	America East tournament
2013	Jon Mueller	23–25	16–14	3rd	America East tournament
2014	Jon Mueller	12–33	7–17	t-6th	
2015	Jon Mueller	14–28	7–13	6th	
2016	Jon Mueller	23–30	9–15	5th	America East tournament
2017	Jon Mueller	26–26	10–13	4th	America East tournament
2018	Jon Mueller	20–28	9–14	6th	America East tournament
2019	Jon Mueller	28–23	14–9	2nd	America East tournament
2020	Jon Mueller	7–5	0–0		Season canceled due to COVID-19 pandemic
2021	Jon Mueller	22–25	20–18	1st (Division A)	America East tournament
2022	Jon Mueller	22–25	11–19	t-3rd (Division A)	America East tournament
America East:		476–631–3	232–255		
Total:		895–1,092-12			
National champion Postseason invitational champion Conference regular season champion Conference regular season and conference tournament champion Division regular season champion Division regular season and conference tournament champion Conference tournament champion

== MLB draft ==
As of 2020, nine players have been selected from Albany in the Major League Baseball draft and none have reached the majors. The highest selections have been Michael Kenney (9th round, 211th overall in 1974) and Stephen Woods Jr. (8th round, 245th overall in 2016).

== See also ==
- List of NCAA Division I baseball programs
