= Edward A. LeLacheur Park =

Baseball stadium in Lowell, Massachusetts

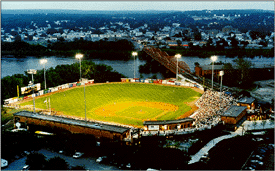
- Edward A. LeLacheur Park LeLacheur Park
- Interactive map of Edward A. LeLacheur Park
- Location: 450 Aiken Street; Lowell, Massachusetts 01854
- Coordinates: 42.65327°N 71.318114°W
- Owner: University of Massachusetts Lowell
- Operator: UMass Lowell River Hawks baseball
- Capacity: 4,797 seated (5,030 with standing room)
- Surface: Grass
- Field size: Left field: 337 ft (103 m); Left-center: 368 ft (112 m); Center field: 400 ft (120 m); Right-center: 368 ft (112 m); Right field: 301 ft (92 m)

Construction
- Groundbreaking: 1996
- Opened: June 22, 1998
- Cost: $11.2 million ($22.1 million in 2025)
- Architect: Populous
- General contractors: Peabody Construction Co., Inc.

Tenants
- Lowell Spinners (NYPL/FCBL) (1998–2020, 2026-Future); UMass Lowell River Hawks (NCAA Division I America East) (1998–present)

Edward A. LeLacheur Park is a ballpark located on the banks of the Merrimack River in Lowell, Massachusetts. It is home to the UMass Lowell River Hawks baseball team, which competes in the America East Conference at the NCAA Division I level. It was previously home to the minor-league Lowell Spinners, a former New York–Penn League affiliate of the Boston Red Sox.

== History ==
The park was built between a partnership with the city of Lowell and the University of Massachusetts Lowell (UMass Lowell). The park was named for State Representative Edward A. LeLacheur, who led the initial redevelopment of Lowell, and opened in 1998. The park was built on the East Campus of UMass Lowell. Populous (formerly HOK Sport) designed the park. It offers views of the Aiken Street Bridge, Lawrence Mills, Fox Hall, and University Suites. The seating bowl is raised above the field. A concourse surrounds the top of the park where the refreshment, merchandise stands, and bathrooms are located. The design enables an open view while waiting in line.

Two seating expansions have been considered since the park opened. One plan would have added 600-1,000 seats on the third base side, to match how the first base side is angled towards the infield. The other proposal, made in 2014, was to add a smaller version of the left-field wall at Fenway Park, the Green Monster, with seating for approximately 200 people. This also would have shortened the field and raised the wall to 20 ft (6.1 m). Neither plan has been implemented.

The ballpark held its first concert on July 10, 2008, when Boston-based Celtic punk band Dropkick Murphys played there with The Mighty Mighty Bosstones.

The Lowell City Council voted on July 26, 2022, to sell Lelacheur Park to UMass Lowell for $1 million. UMass Lowell planned to invest $3 million to maintaining and renovating the park over five years.

== Tenants ==
The ballpark has been the home field of the UMass Lowell River Hawks baseball program since 1998.

From 1998 through 2020, the ballpark was home to the Lowell Spinners, a Class A Short Season affiliate of the Boston Red Sox, who competed in the New York–Penn League (NYPL). Following the 2019 season, Major League Baseball proposed significant changes to the structure of Minor League Baseball, including discontinuation of the NYPL. After the 2020 baseball season, which was cancelled at the minor-league level due to the COVID-19 pandemic, the Red Sox announced that they were dropping the Spinners as an affiliate, as a result of MLB's restructuring of the minor leagues.

In July 2025, the Futures Collegiate Baseball League (FCBL) announced plans to add a new team to the league, to be based at LeLacheur Park. The new Lowell Spinners began playing at LeLacheur Park on May 29, 2026.

== See also ==
- List of NCAA Division I baseball venues
