= Baseball Complex (Binghamton, New York) =

Baseball venue in Vestal, New York

Binghamton Baseball Complex
- Interactive map of Binghamton Baseball Complex
- Location: Bunn Hill Rd. and Vestal Parkway, Vestal, New York, USA
- Coordinates: 42.0943°N 75.9742°W
- Owner: Binghamton University
- Operator: Binghamton University
- Capacity: 1,906
- Scoreboard: Electronic
- Record attendance: 1,906
- Field size: Left Field: 315 feet (96 m); Left Center Field: 365 feet (111 m); Center Field: 390 feet (120 m); Right Center Field: 365 feet (111 m); Right Field: 315 feet (96 m)

Construction
- Renovated: 2022
- Cost: $60 million
- Architect: Fawley Bryant Architecture

Tenant
- Binghamton Bearcats baseball (2022-present)

The Binghamton Baseball Complex is a baseball venue located on the campus of Binghamton University in Vestal, New York, United States. The field is home to the Binghamton Bearcats baseball team of the NCAA Division I America East Conference, and holds a capacity of 1,906 spectators. In 2020, the field received its second major renovation after a $60 million anonymous donation.

== Varsity Field (2012-2020) ==
Following the 2011 season, plans to renovate Varsity Field were announced, funded by a record $2.2 million anonymous donation. The additions and improvements, which were scheduled to be completed prior to the 2012 season, included stadium seating, bullpens, a press box, a PA system, dugouts, and a batter's eye. Due to construction delays, however, the Bearcats were unable to play any 2012 games at the field. The team played the majority of its games on the road and used the Binghamton Mets' NYSEG Stadium and Cornell University's Hoy Field for their seven home games. In 2017, a new electronic scoreboard was installed.

== Binghamton Baseball Complex (2020-present) ==
On February 11, 2020, the school announced that they had received a $60 million anonymous donation to renovate the facility a second time. This renovation would nearly double the capacity of the field to 1,906 spectators, as well as add a 84,000 square foot facility, VIP areas, and two-story press box.

== See also ==
- List of NCAA Division I baseball venues
