= Binghamton Bearcats baseball =

American college baseball team

- 2026 Binghamton Bearcats baseball team
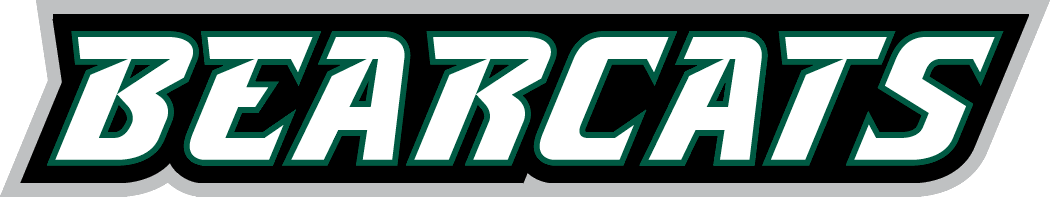
- Founded: 1948
- University: Binghamton University
- Head coach: Tim Sinicki (34th season)
- Conference: America East
- Location: Vestal, New York
- Home stadium: Baseball Complex (capacity: 1,000)
- Nickname: Bearcats
- Colors: Dark green, white, and black

NCAA tournament appearances
- 2009, 2013, 2014, 2016, 2022, 2025, 2026

Conference tournament champions
- 2009, 2013, 2014, 2016, 2022, 2025, 2026

Conference regular season champions
- 2007, 2008, 2009, 2010, 2016, 2017, 2026

The Binghamton Bearcats baseball team is a varsity intercollegiate athletic team of Binghamton University in Vestal, New York, United States. The team is a member of the America East Conference, which is part of the National Collegiate Athletic Association's Division I. The team plays its home games at Varsity Field in Vestal, New York. The Bearcats are coached by Tim Sinicki.

== NCAA tournament results ==
Binghamton has appeared in the NCAA Division I baseball tournament seven times. They have a record of 1–11.

Year	Region	Opponent	Result
2009	Greenville Regional	East Carolina; George Mason; East Carolina	L 7–11; W 11–6; L 9–16
2013	Raleigh Regional	NC State; Ole Miss	L 1–4; L 4–8
2014	Stillwater Regional	Oklahoma State; Nebraska	L 0–8; L 6–8
2016	College Station Regional	Texas A&M; Minnesota	L 2–4; L 5–8
2022	Stanford Regional	Stanford; UC Santa Barbara	L 7–20; L 4–9
2025	Athens Regional	Georgia; Oklahoma State	L 4–20; L 5–13
2026	Morgantown Regional	West Virginia; Wake Forest	L 1–10; L 3-12

== Year-by-year results ==
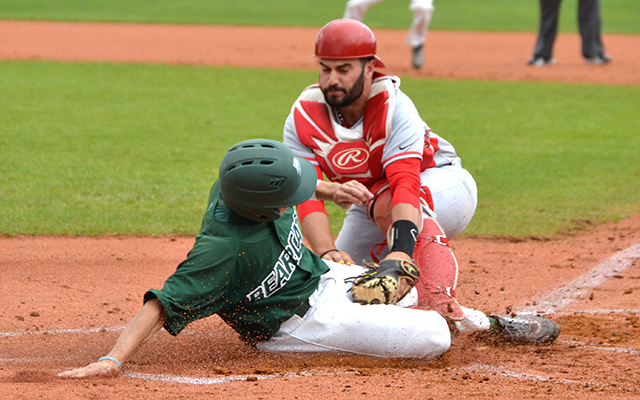
A Bearcats baseball player slides into home plate during a game in 2014.

Below is a table of the program's yearly records since its inception.

Record table
Season	Coach	Overall	Conference	Standing	Postseason
Independent (1948–1973)
1948	Bob Redman	5–6			
1949	Andy Cook	0–3			
1950	Andy Cook	2–7			
1951	Andy Cook	2–6–1			
1952	Dick Hoover	1–6			
No program (1953–1961)
Independent (1962–1973)
1962	Dave Henderson	0–5			
1963	Dave Henderson	2–2			
1964	John Affleck	2–8			
1965	John Affleck	5–3–1			
1966	John Affleck	4–7			
1967	John Affleck	3–6			
1968	John Affleck	5–6			
1969	John Affleck	3–8			
1970	John Affleck	6–7			
1971	John Affleck	10–6			
1972	John Affleck	8–5			
1973	Tim Schum	15–7			
State University of New York Athletic Conference (1974–1997)
1974	Tim Schum	14–16			
1975	Tim Schum	19–16			ECAC Tournament
1976	Tim Schum	14–14			ECAC Tournament
1977	Tim Schum	20–12			ECAC Tournament
1978	Tim Schum	20–11			
1979	Dave van Woert	15–13			
1980	Jerry Bracken/ Greg Partigianoni	14–24			
1981	Greg Partigianoni	7–28			
1982	Dan McCormack	9–21			
1983	Dan McCormack	7–22			
1984	Dan McCormack	17–25			
1985	Dan McCormack	12–13			
1986	Dan McCormack	10–14–1			
1987	Dan McCormack	10–21			
1988	Dan McCormack	19–11			
1989	Dan McCormack	8–11			
1990	Dan McCormack	11–15			
1991	Dan McCormack	5–27			
1992	Dan McCormack	9–16			
1993	Tim Sinicki	12–14	4–8	3rd (East)	
1994	Tim Sinicki	17–15	7–5	2nd (East)	
1995	Tim Sinicki	20–17	7–5	2nd (East)	ECAC Tournament
1996	Tim Sinicki	19–16	6–6	2nd (East)	ECAC Tournament
1997	Tim Sinicki	26–10–1	8–4	2nd (East)	ECAC Tournament
Independent (1998)
1998	Tim Sinicki	14–18–1			
Division III:		421–518–5	32–28 (Note: Records incomplete.)		
New England Collegiate Conference (DII) (1999–2000)
1999	Tim Sinicki	17–22	8–10	6th	
2000	Tim Sinicki	26–19	9–5	3rd	ECAC Tournament
Division II:		43–41	17–15		
New York State Baseball Conference (DI) (2001–2001)
2001	Tim Sinicki	19–26–1	5–5	2nd	NYSBC Tournament
America East Conference (2002–present)
2002	Tim Sinicki	17–34	8–12	5th	
2003	Tim Sinicki	10–40–1	2–20	7th	
2004	Tim Sinicki	22–21	9–11	6th	
2005	Tim Sinicki	23–26–1	12–8	4th	America East tournament
2006	Tim Sinicki	27–23–1	12–11	5th	
2007	Tim Sinicki	28–19	17–5	1st	America East tournament
2008	Tim Sinicki	29–26	15–8	1st	America East tournament
2009	Tim Sinicki	30–22	13–7	1st	NCAA Greenville Regional
2010	Tim Sinicki	31–20	21–3	1st	America East tournament
2011	Tim Sinicki	21–28	13–10	3rd	America East tournament
2012	Tim Sinicki	23–26	13–9	3rd	America East tournament
2013	Tim Sinicki	30–25	16–13	2nd	NCAA Raleigh Regional
2014	Tim Sinicki	25–27	11–12	2nd	NCAA Stillwater Regional
2015	Tim Sinicki	17–24–2	6–16–1	7th	
2016	Tim Sinicki	30–25	19–5	1st	NCAA College Station Regional
2017	Tim Sinicki	30–11	15–4	1st	
2018	Tim Sinicki	18-30-1	9-15	7th	
2019	Tim Sinicki	24-26	12-9	3rd	America East tournament
2020	Tim Sinicki	5-7			Cancelled due to COVID-19
2021	Tim Sinicki	16-20	16-20	3rd (Division B)	
2022	Tim Sinicki	22-29	15-15	2nd (Division B)	NCAA Stanford Regional
Division I:		497–535–7	259–225–1		
Total:		961–1094–12			
National champion Postseason invitational champion Conference regular season champion Conference regular season and conference tournament champion Division regular season champion Division regular season and conference tournament champion Conference tournament champion

== Major League Baseball ==
Binghamton has had 18 Major League Baseball draft picks since the draft began in 1965 and 2 former players play Major League Baseball.

Bearcats in the Major League Baseball Draft
Year	Player	Round	Team
1990	Dan Gray	7	Dodgers
1990	Dirk Gorman	49	Dodgers
2001	Michael Howell	33	Tigers
2001	Jeff Montani	36	Orioles
2008	Jeff Dennis	40	Athletics
2009	Murphy Smith	13	Athletics
2010	Henry Dunn	50	Guardians
2012	Mike Augliera	5	Red Sox
2012	Lee Sosa	26	Athletics
2014	Billy Bereszniewicz	28	Dodgers
2015	Jake Thomas	27	Blue Jays
2016	Mike Bunal	17	Rockies
2017	Justin Yurchak	12	White Sox
2017	Dylan Stock	25	Tigers
2018	Nick Wegmann	34	Mariners
2019	Ben Anderson	13	Rangers
2024	Nick Roselli	11	Mets
2025	Zach Rogacki	9	Rockies

=== Former MLB Players ===
- Scott Diamond
- Murphy Smith

== See also ==
- List of NCAA Division I baseball programs
