= Stony Brook Seawolves baseball =

Stony Brook University baseball team

Stony Brook Seawolves
- 2026 Stony Brook Seawolves baseball team
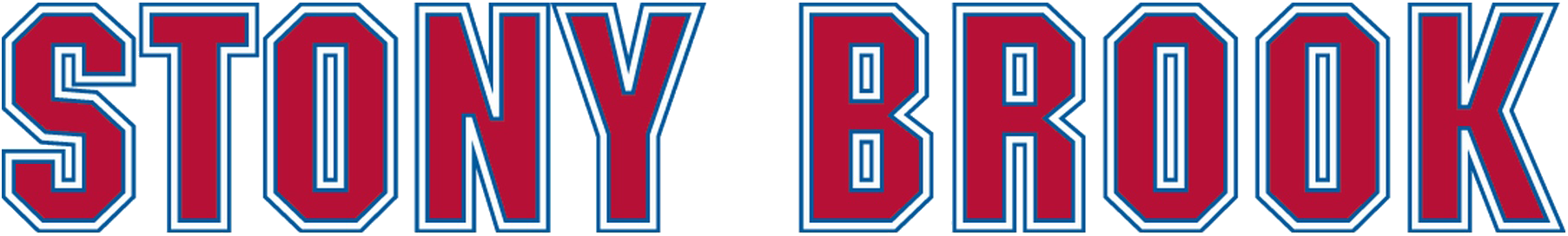
- Founded: 1966; 60 years ago
- University: Stony Brook University
- Head coach: Jim Martin (1st season)
- Conference: CAA
- Location: Stony Brook, New York
- Home stadium: Joe Nathan Field (capacity: 1,250)
- Nickname: Seawolves
- Colors: Red, blue, and gray

College World Series appearances
- 2012

NCAA regional champions
- 2012

NCAA tournament appearances
- 2004, 2008, 2010, 2012, 2015, 2019

Conference tournament champions
- 2004, 2008, 2010, 2012, 2015, 2019

Conference regular season champions
- 2011, 2012, 2014, 2015, 2019, 2021, 2022

The Stony Brook Seawolves baseball team represents Stony Brook University in NCAA Division I men's college baseball. Stony Brook currently competes in the Coastal Athletic Association (CAA) and plays its home games on Joe Nathan Field. Jim Martin has coached the team since the beginning of the 2026 season. The team has won the America East tournament six times in 2004, 2008, 2010, 2012, 2015, and 2019. In 2011, the Seawolves claimed their first America East regular season championship. Stony Brook has participated in the NCAA tournament on six occasions, winning its first game in 2010.

In 2012, the Seawolves clinched their second consecutive regular season championship and their fourth America East Conference baseball tournament championship, earning the league's automatic bid to the 2012 NCAA Division I baseball tournament. The team went on to win the Coral Gables Regional and the Baton Rouge Super Regional, becoming the first ever team from the America East Conference to advance to the Men's College World Series.

== History ==
=== Pre-Division I era (1966–98) ===
Stony Brook first fielded NCAA–sanctioned baseball in 1966. The program struggled hard initially, posting only six winning seasons until the hiring of Matt Senk as head coach in 1991. Senk's leadership helped the team succeed at the Division III level, and Stony Brook finished 1995 with a 30–8 record and a trip to their first Division III NCAA tournament. Stony Brook shortstop Joe Nathan was drafted by the San Francisco Giants in the sixth round with the 159th overall pick in the 1995 MLB draft. He debuted for the Giants in 1999 as a pitcher, becoming the first player in program history to play in the MLB.

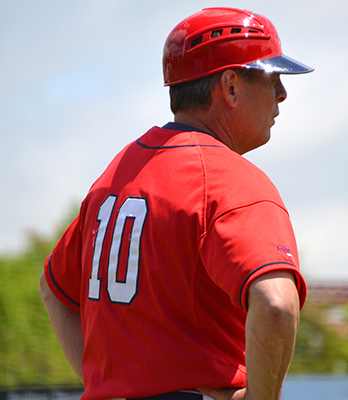
Matt Senk, Stony Brook's head coach since 1991

=== Early years in Division I (1999–2004) ===
Stony Brook began in Division I as a member of the Eastern College Athletic Conference. In 2002, the Seawolves joined the America East Conference. In 2003, Stony Brook advanced to its first America East Tournament title game, needing to beat Northeastern twice to win the championship. While they won 11–10 in game one, they were blown out 11–0, leaving them one game away from its first NCAA tournament berth. In 2004, the fourth-place Seawolves upset first-place Northeastern 15–6 in the first round of the America East Tournament, and advanced to the championship game for a second straight year, this time defeating Maine 3–1 to win their first America East championship and advance to their first NCAA tournament in the program's Division I history. Stony Brook was assigned as the fourth seed in the Kinston Regional, where they lost to host East Carolina 8–2 and Tennessee 1–0 and were eliminated from the tournament in two games.

=== Program on the rise (2005–11) ===
After reaching their first NCAA tournament in 2004, Stony Brook followed up with its first losing season since 1997, not qualifying for the America East Tournament. Stony Brook suffered another losing season in 2006 and a quick elimination from the America East Tournament in 2007. On December 6, 2006, Joe Nathan's No. 22 was retired, becoming the first retired number in Stony Brook athletics history. In 2008, Stony Brook finished 34–26 (14–10 America East) in second place in the regular season behind the Binghamton Bearcats. In the double-elimination tournament, the Seawolves beat UMBC and Binghamton twice to clinch their second tournament championship and advance to their second NCAA tournament Regionals. In the Tempe Regional of the NCAA tournament, Stony Brook lost 9–7 to Arizona State and 9–4 to Vanderbilt, resulting in another early exit from the tournament.

The 2009 season was less promising and the Seawolves ended the regular season in third place with a 29–23 (14–10) record. Stony Brook was ousted early in the America East tournament after consecutive losses against second-seeded Albany and fourth-seeded Vermont. In 2010, Stony Brook ended 30–27 (15–9), entering the tournament as the third seed but surprising with victories against Maine and consecutive victories against Albany to earn its third tournament championship. In the NCAA tournament, the Seawolves played in the Myrtle Beach Regional. They lost to Coastal Carolina 6–0, but defeated NC State 6–2 in the loser's bracket to earn their first victory in the tournament. The Seawolves were then eliminated in a rematch with Coastal Carolina, losing 25–7.

In 2011, Nathan's donation allowed for the construction of a new venue, Joe Nathan Field, which was unsuitable for play entering the season. As a result, the Seawolves played their home games at Baseball Heaven in Yaphank, New York. Joe Nathan Field opened on May 20, 2011. Stony Brook won its first conference regular season title in 2011 after going 22–2 in America East play; the Seawolves ended with a program-record 42 wins and went 42–12. However, Stony Brook was upset twice in the America East Tournament, once by Albany and again by Maine to eliminate the Seawolves before reaching the title game, putting their record-breaking season to a stunning halt.

=== College World Series run (2012) ===
2012 America East Conference baseball standings
	Conf.						Overall
Team	W		L		T	PCT	W		L		T	PCT
No. 8 Stony Brook ‍†‍‡‍^{y}	21	–	3	–	0	.875	52	–	15	–	0	.776
Albany ‍‍‍	16	–	8	–	0	.667	22	–	32	–	1	.409
Binghamton ‍‍‍	13	–	9	–	0	.591	23	–	26	–	0	.469
Maine ‍‍‍	11	–	11	–	0	.500	28	–	28	–	0	.500
Hartford ‍‍‍	7	–	17	–	0	.292	16	–	40	–	0	.286
UMBC ‍‍‍	2	–	22	–	0	.083	10	–	42	–	0	.192
† – Conference champion ‡ – Tournament champion y – Invited to the 2012 NCAA Division I baseball tournament As of June 17, 2012; Rankings from Coaches' Poll

Stony Brook opened its 2012 campaign with a perfect 4–0 weekend at Thibodaux, Louisiana, with a pair of victories over Alabama State and Nicholls State in the Colonel Round Robin. The Seawolves' only losses in conference play came against East Carolina in a sweep, Kansas, Minnesota, Yale and Holy Cross. When conference play started, Stony Brook was 17–8.

Stony Brook went 21–3 in conference play, losing two games to Binghamton and one to Albany. The Seawolves continued to earn non-conference wins against Iona, Marist, Rhode Island, Central Connecticut and Fairfield in the middle of the conference season, entering the America East tournament with a 43–11 record. Stony Brook beat Maine 14–6, Binghamton 7–4 and Maine 13–6 to win the conference title, advancing to the 2012 NCAA Division I baseball tournament with a 46–11 record, the best record in Division I.

The Seawolves were the first team in the America East since 2002 to earn both the regular season and conference tournament championships in the same season. For the first time in the history of the program, Stony Brook found itself ranked, sitting at No. 25 in the Baseball America poll and No. 29 in the NCBWA poll.

Stony Brook traveled to South Florida to play in the Coral Gables Regional as the fourth seed. In the first game the Seawolves knocked off top-seeded Miami and went on to the winner's bracket. Following a loss to second-seeded Central Florida, Stony Brook beat Missouri State in dramatic fashion, striking out Luke Voit in the bottom of the ninth with the bases loaded in a 10–7 win. The Seawolves topped Central Florida 12–5 and 10–6 in consecutive days to win the regional and advance to face the LSU Tigers in the Super Regionals.

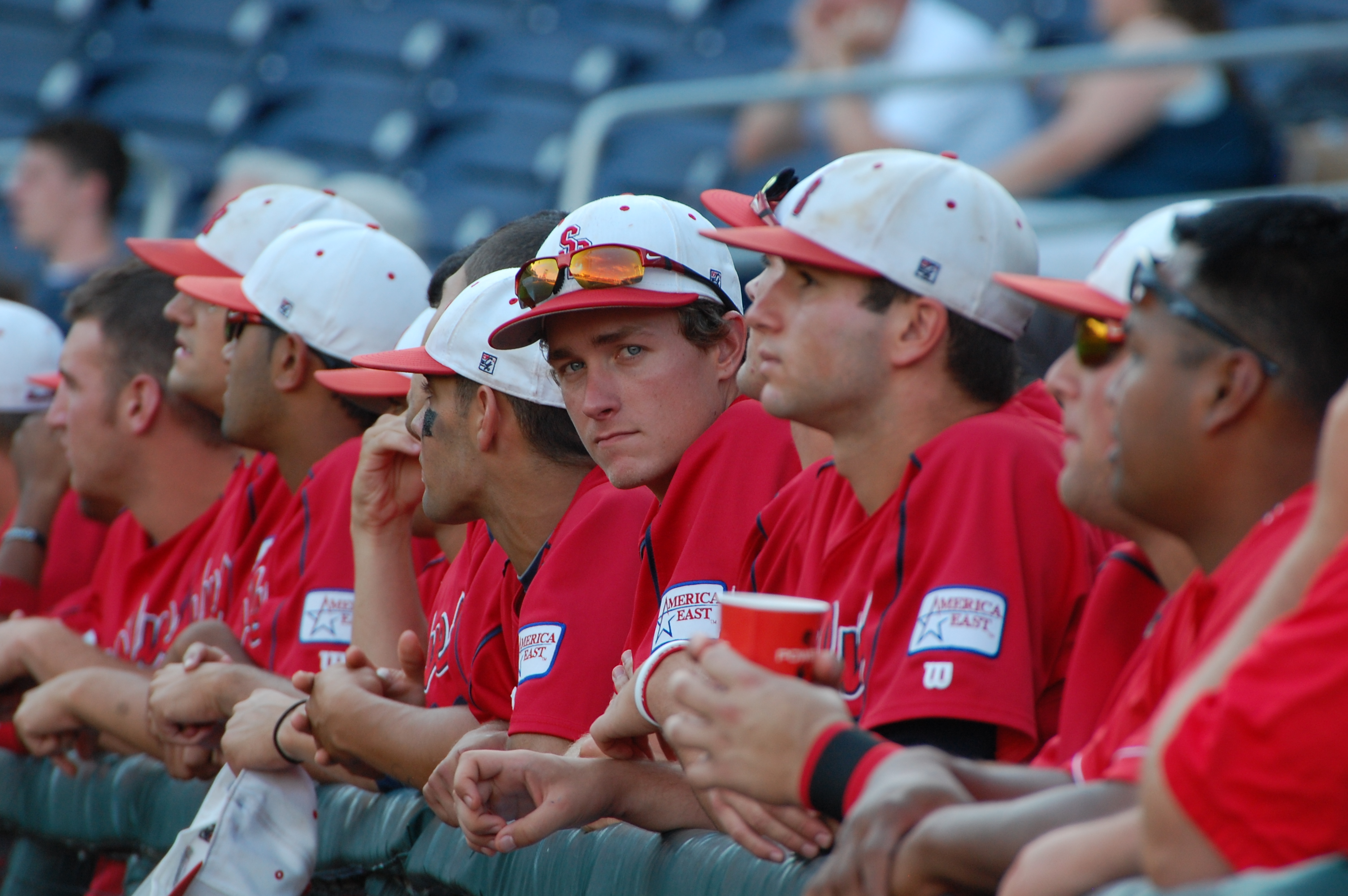
Stony Brook baseball players at the 2012 College World Series

In a rain-soaked Baton Rouge Super Regional, Stony Brook fell in the first game to LSU, who started pitcher Aaron Nola, in an extra-innings affair that spanned two days due to rain. In game two, LSU started pitcher Kevin Gausman, who had closed out the game one victory hours before, with Stony Brook winning 3–1 behind a 127-pitch complete game. In a winner-take-all game three, Stony Brook won 7–2 and advanced to the 2012 College World Series in Omaha, Nebraska. The Seawolves were the second team to be the fourth seed in its regional and advance to the College World Series. Stony Brook was the first Northeast school to reach Omaha since 1986 and the first school from New York to do so since St. John's in 1980.

In the College World Series, Stony Brook's Cinderella run came to an end, losing to UCLA 9–1 and Florida State 12–2. Stony Brook ended the season with a 52–15 record, the most wins in college baseball, a No. 8 national ranking in the NCBWA poll and seven players selected in the 2012 MLB draft, including outfielder Travis Jankowski being selected in the first round by the San Diego Padres.

=== Final America East years (2013–2022) ===
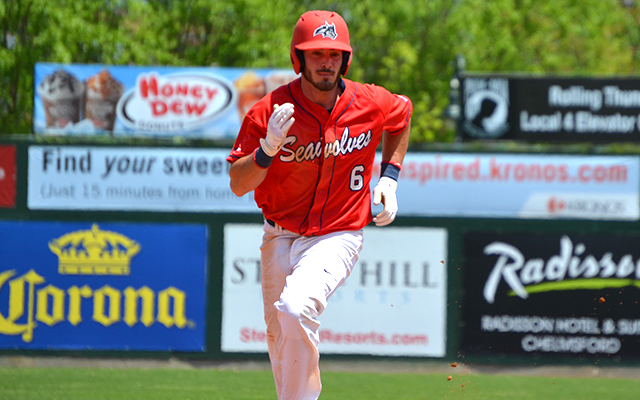
Stony Brook catcher Kevin Krause, conference MVP, at the 2014 America East Conference baseball tournament

Stony Brook followed up its College World Series campaign with a disappointing 25–34 season, finishing fourth in the America East and being eliminated in the first two games of the tournament. In 2014, Stony Brook won its third America East regular season title with a 35–18 (18–5) record. The Seawolves advanced to the championship round of the conference tournament in the winner's bracket but lost to Binghamton in both games, 4–3 and 8–7, and were eliminated.

Stony Brook won back-to-back regular season championships in 2015, reaching the finals from the winner's bracket again, and this time beat UMBC 16–11 to reach its fifth NCAA tournament. Playing in the Fort Worth Regional, the Seawolves lost to North Carolina State 3–0, beat Sacred Heart 11–6 and were eliminated with an 8–3 loss to TCU.

In 2016, Stony Brook finished in third place in the America East, advancing to the tournament championship from the loser's bracket before falling to Binghamton. In 2017, Stony Brook finished in third again but lost two quick games in the playoffs. Stony Brook finished in fourth place in 2018, again reaching the championship game from the loser's bracket and losing to Hartford.

The Seawolves won their fifth regular season title and sixth America East Tournament title in 2019, beating Binghamton in the championship. In the NCAA tournament, Stony Brook was placed in the Baton Rouge Regional, scheduled to face LSU in a rematch of the 2012 series that sent the Seawolves to Omaha. LSU won the rematch 17–3. The Seawolves were eliminated from the NCAA tournament with a following 13–5 loss to Arizona State, which rostered future number-one MLB draft pick Spencer Torkelson.

The 2020 season was canceled on March 12 because of the COVID-19 pandemic. Stony Brook played 15 games to a 6–9 record. Stony Brook won its sixth regular season title in 2021, setting the America East all-time record for most conference wins in a season (25). Hosting the conference tournament at Joe Nathan Field, Stony Brook advanced to the championship but did so from the loser's bracket. Up 1–0 against NJIT, the game was halted due to rain and never resumed. The America East controversially awarded the title and NCAA tournament bid to NJIT since the Highlanders were in the winner's bracket.

Before the 2022 season began, the America East controversially prohibited Stony Brook from participating in the conference tournament because of the school's impending move to the Colonial Athletic Association (now the Coastal Athletic Association).

== NCAA tournament appearances ==
AE Tourney champions	Postseason game and location	Opponents and results
2004	NCAA Regional (Grainger Stadium) – Kinston, NC	Loss vs. East Carolina (2–8)
2004	NCAA Regional (Grainger Stadium) – Kinston, NC	Loss vs. Tennessee (0–1)
2008	NCAA Regional (Packard Stadium) – Tempe, AZ	Loss vs. Arizona State (7–9)
2008	NCAA Regional (Packard Stadium) – Tempe, AZ	Loss vs. Vanderbilt (4–9)
2010	NCAA Regional (BB&T Coastal Field) – Myrtle Beach, SC	Loss vs. Coastal Carolina (0–6)
2010	NCAA Regional (BB&T Coastal Field) – Myrtle Beach, SC	Win vs. North Carolina State (6–2)
2010	NCAA Regional (BB&T Coastal Field) – Myrtle Beach, SC	Loss vs. Coastal Carolina (7–25)
2012	NCAA Regional (Alex Rodriguez Park at Mark Light Field) – Coral Gables, FL	Win vs. Miami FL (10–2)
2012	NCAA Regional (Alex Rodriguez Park at Mark Light Field) – Coral Gables, FL	Loss vs. Central Florida (8–9)
2012	NCAA Regional (Alex Rodriguez Park at Mark Light Field) – Coral Gables, FL	Win vs. Missouri State (10–7)
2012	NCAA Regional (Alex Rodriguez Park at Mark Light Field) – Coral Gables, FL	Win vs. Central Florida (12–5)
2012	NCAA Regional (Alex Rodriguez Park at Mark Light Field) – Coral Gables, FL	Win vs. Central Florida (10–6)
2012	NCAA Super Regional (Alex Box Stadium) – Baton Rouge, LA	Loss vs. LSU (4–5)
2012	NCAA Super Regional (Alex Box Stadium) – Baton Rouge, LA	Win vs. LSU (3–1)
2012	NCAA Super Regional (Alex Box Stadium) – Baton Rouge, LA	Win vs. LSU (7–2)
2012	College Word Series (TD Ameritrade Park Omaha) – Omaha, NE	Loss vs. UCLA (9–1)
2012	College Word Series (TD Ameritrade Park Omaha) – Omaha, NE	Loss vs. Florida State (12–2)
2015	NCAA Regional (Lupton Stadium) – Fort Worth, TX	Loss vs. North Carolina State (0–3)
2015	NCAA Regional (Lupton Stadium) – Fort Worth, TX	Win vs. Sacred Heart (11–6)
2015	NCAA Regional (Lupton Stadium) – Fort Worth, TX	Loss vs. TCU (3–8)
2019	NCAA Regional (Alex Box Stadium) – Baton Rouge, LA	Loss vs. LSU (3–17)
2019	NCAA Regional (Alex Box Stadium) – Baton Rouge, LA	Loss vs. Arizona State (5–13)

== Alumni in Major League Baseball ==
The following Stony Brook players have reached Major League Baseball:

- Joe Nathan (1999–2016)
- Tom Koehler (2012–2017)
- Nick Tropeano (2014–2021)
- Travis Jankowski (2015–2025)
- Daniel Zamora (2018–2021)

== Facilities ==
Joe Nathan Field during a Stony Brook baseball game

=== Joe Nathan Field ===
Joe Nathan Field, located in the north end of the Stony Brook campus, is the home field of Seawolves baseball. Known as Seawolves Field until 2002 and University Field from 2002 to 2011, the field was named after Stony Brook alumnus and six-time MLB All-Star relief pitcher Joe Nathan, who donated $500,000 for the construction of a new baseball field in 2008. As part of the renovations, a new FieldTurf was installed and dugouts were constructed. Additional donations allowed for a new scoreboard adjacent to the field.

The field's dimensions are 330 feet to left and right field, 365 feet to left and right center, and 390 feet to center field. Joe Nathan Field's capacity stands at 1,000 spectators. Stony Brook has hosted the 2011 and 2012 America East Baseball Tournaments at Joe Nathan Field.

== Year-by-year results ==
Year	Overall Record	Win %	Conference Record	Conf. Win %	Standing	Postseason appearances
Division III: Independent (1966–1967, Herb Brown)
1966	3–5	.375				
1967	7–11	.388				
Independent (1968–1970, Frank Tirico)
1968	7–10	.411				
1969	7–11	.388				
1970	5–17	.227				
Independent (1968–1977, Rick Smoliak)
1971	3–14	.176				
1972	6–13	.315				
1973	9–15	.375				
1974	12–10	.545				
1975	12–13	.480				
1976	13–10	.565				
1977	6–16	.272				
Independent (1978–1979, Byrne Gamble)
1978	10–13	.434				
1979	12–6	.666				
Independent (1980, Rich Krumholz)
1980	13–14	.481				
Independent (1981–1982, Rich Wurster)
1981	13–17	.433				
1982	3–21	.125				
Independent (1983–1988, Mike Garafola)
1983	6–12	.333				
1984	6–17	.260				
1985	7–19	.269				
1986	12–10	.545				
1987	11–10	.523				
1988	9–21	.300				
ECAC Baseball (1989–1990, Tim Tenaglia)
1989	16–10	.615				Knickerbocker Conference DIII Champs ECAC Quarterfinals
1990	12–15	.444				
ECAC Baseball (1991–2001, Matt Senk)
1991	16–9	.640				
1992	17–12	.586				ECAC co-champions
1993	13–14	.481				
1994	26–9	.742				ECAC Runner-up
1995	30–8	.789				NCAA Division III New York Regional
1996	27–14	.658				ECAC Semifinals
1997	15–19	.441				
1998	23–11	.671				ECAC Quarterfinals
1999	36–12	.750				ECAC Champions
2000	30–11	.731				
2001	35–16	.686				
Division I: America East (2002–present, Matt Senk)
2002	27–24	.529	11–11	.500	4th	America East Conference Tournament: D. Elim. (Game I: won against Maine 16–4) (Game II: lost against Northeastern 5–10) (Game III: lost against Maine 3–9)
2003	33–21	.611	15–9	.625	3rd	America East Conference Tournament: D. Elim. (Game I: won against Maine 4–2) (Game II: lost against Northeastern 4–5) (Game III: won against Maine 6–3) (Game IV: won against Northeastern 11–10) (Game V: lost against Northeastern 0–11)
2004	29–27	.524	11–10	.518	4th	America East Conference Tournament: D. Elim. (3–0); NCAA Regional (Game I: lost against East Carolina 2–8) (Game II: lost against Tennessee 0–1)
2005	23–28	.451	10–11	.476	6th	DNQ
2006	25–29	.463	13–8	.619	2nd	America East Conference Tournament: D. Elim. (Game I: lost against Maine 8–11) (Game II: won against Albany 5–3) (Game III: won against Vermont 2–1) (Game IV: lost against Maine 3–5)
2007	31–24	.694	16–7	.564	2nd	America East Conference Tournament: D. Elim. (Game I: lost against Albany 2–5) (Game II: lost against Maine 8–13)
2008	34–26	.567	14–10	.558	2nd	America East Conference Tournament: D. Elim. (3–0); NCAA Regional (Game I: lost against Arizona State 7–9) (Game II: lost against Vanderbilt 4–9)
2009	29–23	.583	14–10	.558	3rd	America East Conference Tournament: D Elim. (Game I: lost against Albany 1–8) (Game II: lost against Vermont 11–13)
2010	30–27	.526	15–9	.625	3rd	America East Conference Tournament: D Elim. (3–0); NCAA Regional (Game I: lost against Coastal Carolina 0–6) (Game II: won against North Carolina State 6–2) (Game III: lost against Coastal Carolina 5–27)
2011	42–12	.777	22–2	.916	1st	America East Conference Tournament: D Elim. Played at Joe Nathan Field, Stony Brook, NY (Game I: won against Albany 14–2) (Game II: lost against Maine 1–8) (Game III: lost against Albany 1–4)
2012	52–15	.800	21–3	.875	1st	America East Conference Tournament: D Elim. (3–0); Played at Joe Nathan Field, Stony Brook, NY; NCAA Regional (4–1); Played at M.L Field at Alex Rodriguez Park; NCAA Super Regional (2–1); Played at Alex Box Stadium; NCAA College World Series (0–2); Played at TD Ameritrade Park Omaha
2013	25–34	.424	15–15	.500	4th	America East Conference Tournament: D Elim. Played at LeLacheur Park, Lowell, MA (Game I: won against Maine 4–1) (Game II: won against Hartford 10–6) (Game III: lost against Binghamton 3–4) (Game IV: lost against Binghamton 7–8, 12 inn.)
2014	35–18	.660	18–5	.783	1st	America East Conference Tournament: D Elim. Played at LeLacheur Park, Lowell, MA (Game I: lost against Maine 0–7) (Game II: won against Albany 3–1) (Game III: lost against Maine 1–3)
2015	35–16–1	.686	18–4–1	.818	1st	America East Conference Tournament: D Elim. (3–0); NCAA Regional (Game I: lost against North Carolina State 0–6) (Game II: won against Sacred Heart 11–6) (Game III: lost against TCU 3–8)
2016	27–27	.500	13–9	.591	3rd	America East Conference Tournament: D Elim. Played at LeLacheur Park, Lowell, MA (Game I: won against Maine 1–0) (Game II: lost against Hartford 6–7, 10 inn.) (Game III: won against Albany 10–4) (Game IV: won against Hartford 3–2) (Game V: lost against Binghamton 3–6)
2017	26–26	.500	12–10	.545	3rd	America East Conference Tournament: D Elim. Played at LeLacheur Park, Lowell, MA (Game I: won against Hartford 4–3) (Game II: lost against UMBC 2–3) (Game III: lost against Maine 0–3)
2018	32–25	.561	12–12	.500	4th	America East Conference Tournament: D Elim. Played at LeLacheur Park, Lowell, MA (Game I: won against Maine 2–1) (Game II: lost against Hartford 0–2) (Game III: won against Maine 11–4) (Game IV: won against UMass Lowell 6–5) (Game V: lost against Hartford 5–9)
2019	31–21	.596	15–9	.625	1st	America East Conference Tournament: D Elim. (3–0) NCAA Regional (Game I: lost against LSU 3–17) (Game II: lost against Arizona State 5–13)
Total	1026–863–5	.543	250–145–1	.633	N/A	

== Conference awards ==
=== America East Coach of the Year ===
- Matt Senk – 2011, 2012, 2014, 2015

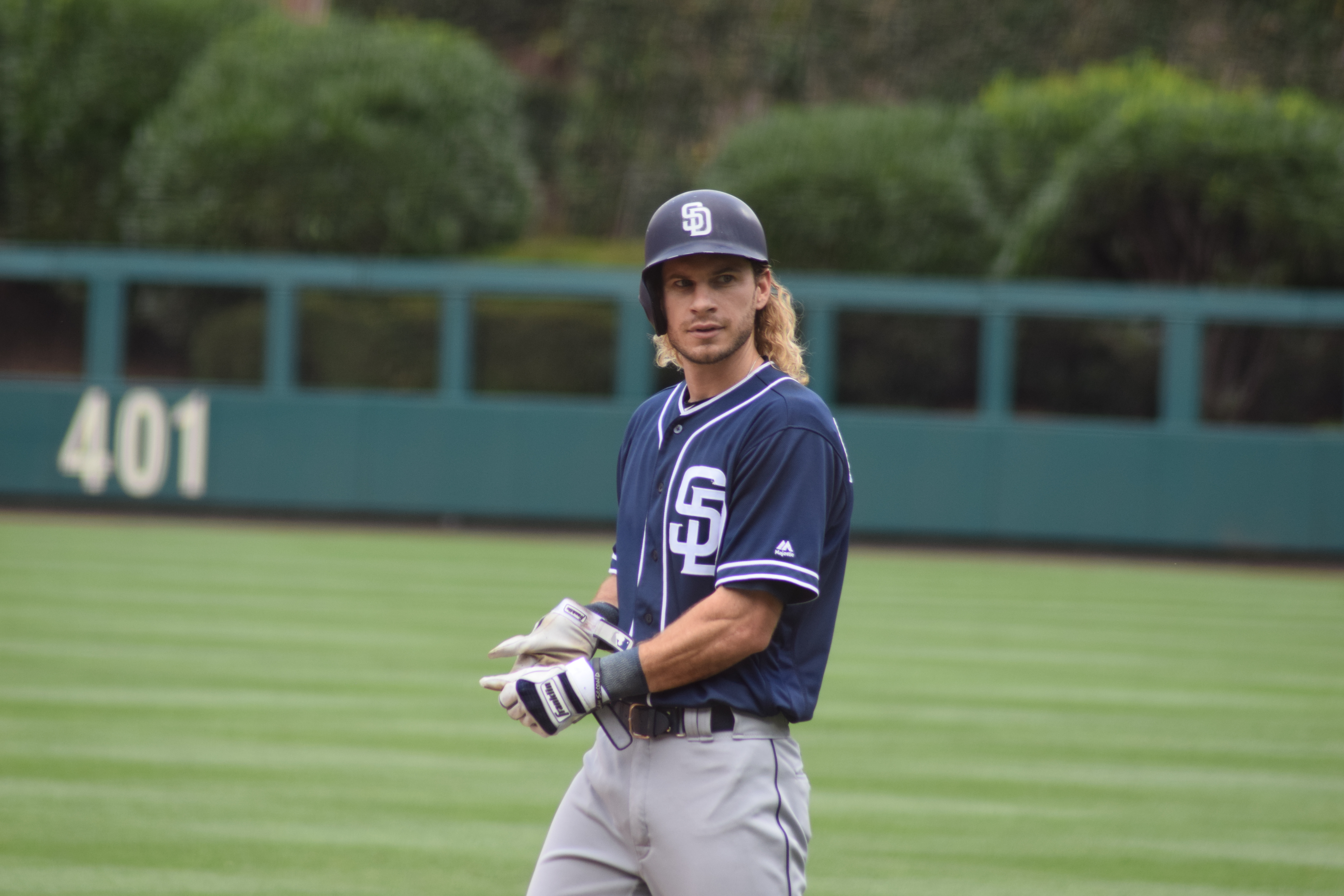
Travis Jankowski, 2012 America East Player of the Year

=== America East Player of the Year ===
- Willie Carmona – 2011
- Travis Jankowski – 2012
- Kevin Krause – 2014
- Jack Parenty – 2015
- Toby Handley – 2017
- Nick Grande – 2019
- Evan Giordano - 2022

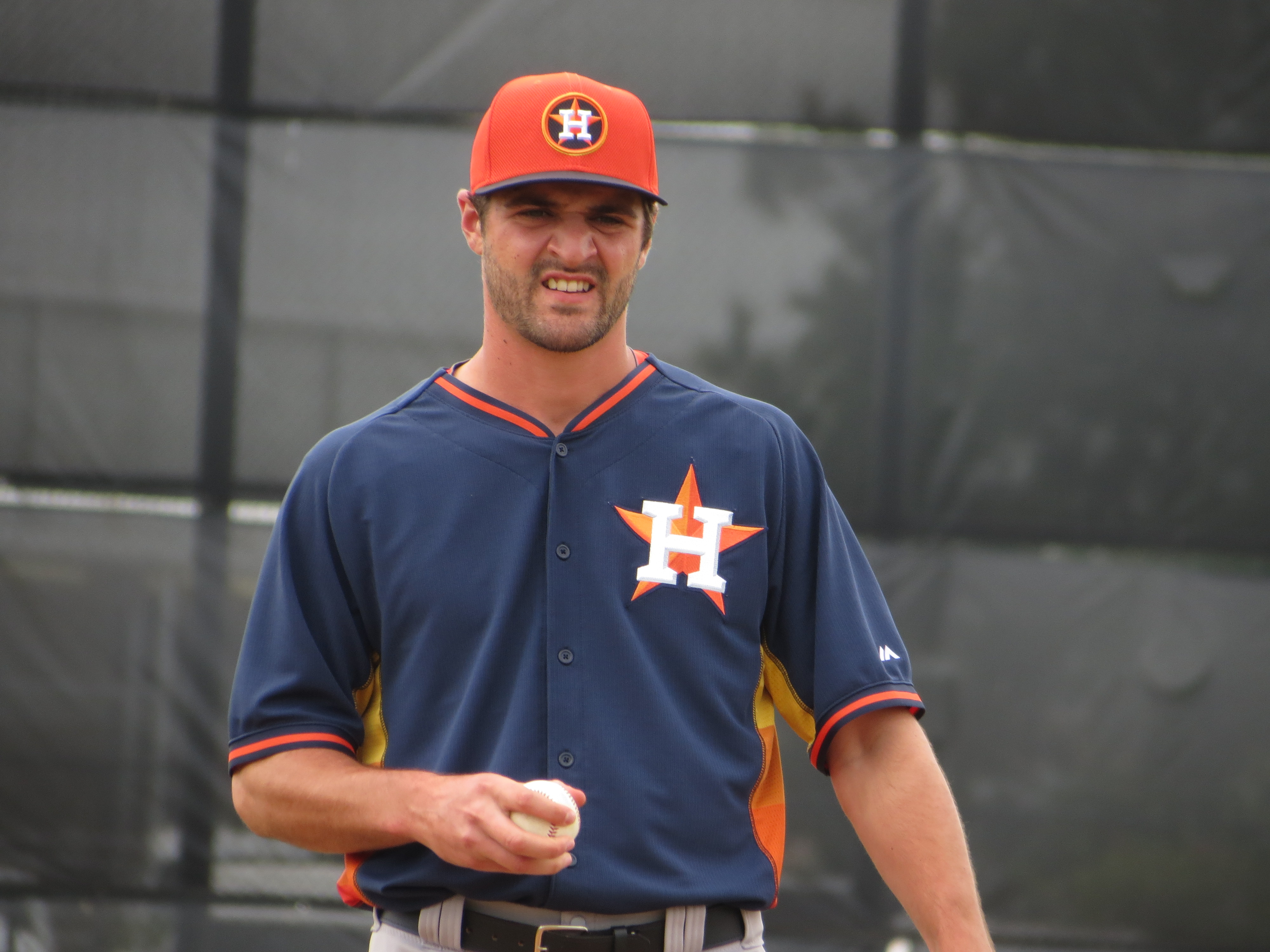
Nick Tropeano, 2010 and 2011 America East Pitcher of the Year

=== America East Pitcher of the Year ===
- Gary Novakowski – 2007
- Nick Tropeano – 2010, 2011
- Tyler Johnson – 2012

=== America East Rookie of the Year ===
- Jon Lewis – 2002
- Willie Carmona – 2010
- Brandon McNitt – 2011
- Cole Peragine – 2012
- Jack Parenty – 2013
- Cameron Stone – 2014
- Bret Clarke – 2016

=== Coastal Athletic Association Rookie of the Year ===
- Erik Paulsen - 2024

== See also ==
- List of NCAA Division I baseball programs
