= List of Maine Black Bears head baseball coaches =

The Maine Black Bears baseball program is a college baseball team that represents the University of Maine in the America East Conference. The Huskies compete in the National Collegiate Athletic Association (NCAA) Division I. The current head coach is Nick Derba, who has led the team since 2017.

The team has had twenty five head coaches since its first season of baseball in 1881. There was no team in 1892 and again in 1944 due to World War II. Since its creation in 1947, the Black Bears have made six appearances in the College World Series, one under Jack Butterfield and five under John Winkin.

W. W. Bustard has the highest winning percentage with .692. Of coaches with at least five seasons, Winkin holds the mark with a winning percentage of .599 over his twenty-two seasons. E. G. Butman recorded the lowest at .200 in 1906. Winkin coached the most seasons, while five coaches led only one season. The Black Bears won one New England Conference title under William C. Kenyon and six Yankee Conference championships, one under Mike Lude, three under Butterfield, and two under Winkin. Winkin also led Maine to seven ECAC titles in eight seasons and their first three America East Conference championships. Paul Kostacopoulos and Steve Trimper added one more America East title each and Derba delivered two more. Winkin won seven ECAC Tournaments and the first America East Tournament title, Kostacopoulos and Trimper won two more, while Derba won another.

== Key ==
General
#	Number of coaches (Note: A running total of the number of head coaches.)
GC	Games coached
†	Elected to the National College Baseball Hall of Fame

Overall
OW	Wins
OL	Losses
OT	Ties
O%	Winning percentage

Conference (Note: Maine played in the New England Conference from 1937–43, the Yankee Conference from 1949–1979, ECAC from 1982–89, and the North Atlantic/America East Conference since 1990.)
CW	Wins
CL	Losses
CT	Ties
C%	Winning percentage

Postseason (Note: Postseason play involving the NCAA Division I Baseball Championship.)
PA	Total Appearances (Note: Postseason appearances include seasons with NCAA Division I Baseball Championship bids since the tournament began in 1947.)
PW	Total Wins
PL	Total Losses
WA	College World Series appearances (Note: College World Series appearances include seasons with CWS bids since the tournament began in 1947.)
WW	College World Series wins
WL	College World Series losses

Championships
DC	Division regular season (Note: The America East Conference used a divisional format for two seasons: 2021 and 2022.)
CC	Conference regular season
CT	Conference tournament (Note: Maine played in the ECAC Tournament from 1976 to 1989, while the America East Conference baseball tournament began in 1993.)

== Coaches ==
List of head baseball coaches showing season(s) coached, overall records, conference records, postseason records, championships and selected awards*Statistics correct as of the end of the 2026 NCAA Division I baseball season
#	Name	Term (Note: Maine did not sponsor a baseball team in 1918 or 1944.)	GC	OW	OL	OT	O%	CW	CL	CT	C%	PA	PW	PL	WA	WW	WL	DCs	CCs	CTs	NCs	Awards (Note: National, regional and conference coach of the year awards.)
1	No Coach	1881–1891, 1893	83	45	37	1	.548	—	—	—	—	—	—	—	—	—	—	—	—	—	0	—
2	Harry Miller	1894–1895	24	13	11	0	.542	—	—	—	—	—	—	—	—	—	—	—	—	—	0	—
3	Jack Abbott	1896	9	5	4	0	.556	—	—	—	—	—	—	—	—	—	—	—	—	—	0	—
4	W. W. Bustard	1897–1898	26	18	8	0	.692	—	—	—	—	—	—	—	—	—	—	—	—	—	0	—
5	William Magill	1899–1901	37	24	13	0	.649	—	—	—	—	—	—	—	—	—	—	—	—	—	0	—
6	Frank Rudderham	1902–1905	60	33	27	0	.550	—	—	—	—	—	—	—	—	—	—	—	—	—	0	—
7	E. G. Butman	1906	15	3	12	0	.200	—	—	—	—	—	—	—	—	—	—	—	—	—	0	—
8	W. J. Fitzmaurice	1907–1908	25	7	18	0	.280	—	—	—	—	—	—	—	—	—	—	—	—	—	0	—
9	P. J. Noonan	1909	12	7	5	0	.583	—	—	—	—	—	—	—	—	—	—	—	—	—	0	—
10	Pat Keefe	1910	12	8	4	0	.667	—	—	—	—	—	—	—	—	—	—	—	—	—	0	—
11	Edgar Wingard	1911	11	3	8	0	.273	—	—	—	—	—	—	—	—	—	—	—	—	—	0	—
12	George Magoon	1912–1913	26	12	13	1	.481	—	—	—	—	—	—	—	—	—	—	—	—	—	0	—
13	John Phelan	1914–1915	27	12	15	0	.444	—	—	—	—	—	—	—	—	—	—	—	—	—	0	—
14	Monte Cross	1916–1921	69	33	33	3	.500	—	—	—	—	—	—	—	—	—	—	—	—	—	0	—
15	Wilkie Clark	1922–1923	29	14	15	0	.483	—	—	—	—	—	—	—	—	—	—	—	—	—	0	—
16	Joseph Murphy	1924–1925	25	10	14	1	.420	—	—	—	—	—	—	—	—	—	—	—	—	—	0	—
17	Fred Brice	1926–1935	127	67	60	0	.528	—	—	—	—	—	—	—	—	—	—	—	—	—	0	—
18	William C. Kenyon	1936–1943, 1945–1949	180	67	111	2	.378	18	39	0	.316	—	—	—	—	—	—	—	1	—	0	—
19	Mike Lude	1950–1951	41	22	19	0	.537	6	5	0	.545	—	—	—	—	—	—	—	1	—	0	—
20	Tubby Raymond	1952–1953	40	22	17	1	.563	5	4	0	.556	—	—	—	—	—	—	—	—	—	0	—
21	Walter H. Anderson	1954–1956	41	19	21	1	.476	5	15	0	.250	—	—	—	—	—	—	—	—	—	0	—
22	Jack Butterfield	1957–1974	411	240	169	2	.586	99	76	1	.565	1	2	0	1	3	2	—	3	—	0	1964 National Coach of the Year
23	John Winkin	1975–1996	1,085	652	430	3	.602	214	83	1	.720	11	26	12	6	4	12	—	12	8	0	—
24	Paul Kostacopoulos	1997–2005	469	274	195	0	.584	137	85	0	.617	2	1	4	—	—	—	—	1	2	0	—
25	Steve Trimper	2006–2016	603	309	292	2	.514	140	115	0	.549	1	1	2	—	—	—	—	1	1	0	—
26	Nick Derba	2017–present	472	198	274	0	.419	122	103	0	.542	1	0	2	—	—	—	1	1	1	0	—
