= Jack Butterfield (baseball) =

American baseball coach and executive

Biographical details
- Born: August 5, 1929
- Died: November 16, 1979 (aged 50)

Playing career
- 1951–1953: Maine

Coaching career (HC unless noted)
- 1956: Maine (assistant)
- 1957–1974: Maine
- 1975–1976: South Florida

Head coaching record
- Overall: 301–193–3
- Tournaments: 5–2 (NCAA)

Accomplishments and honors

Championships
- NCAA Regional (1964); 4 Yankee Conference (1964 – outright; 1960, 1966, 1970 – shared); 8 Maine State Series (1967, 1968, 1970, 1971, 1974 – outright; 1960, 1966, 1969 – shared)

Awards
- 1964 NCAA Division I National Coach of the Year; Maine Sports Hall of Fame

John Butterfield (August 5, 1929 – November 16, 1979) was an American college baseball coach and professional baseball executive. Butterfield grew up in Westborough, Massachusetts and played college baseball for Maine in the early 1950s and later was the head coach at Maine and South Florida. In the late 1970s, he became an executive in the New York Yankees organization before he died in a car crash in November 1979.

== Coaching career ==
=== Maine ===
Butterfield's coaching career began at Maine in 1956, when he assisted head coach Walter Anderson and coached the school's junior varsity team. For the 1957 season, Butterfield was named the head coach. He held the position from 1957–1974 and compiled an overall record of 240-169-2.

Maine's best season under Butterfield was 1964, when the team went 21-8 and won the Yankee Conference outright to qualify for the program's first NCAA tournament. In the best-of-three District 1 Regional held in Boston, Maine swept Northeastern in two games to advance to the College World Series. There, Maine won its opening game against Seton Hall, 5-1, before dropping its second to Minnesota, 12-0. In the loser's bracket, the Black Bears defeated Arizona State and USC but were eliminated by Missouri and finished third. Butterfield was named NCAA Coach of the Year, and Joe Ferris was named the tournament's Most Outstanding Player.

In Butterfield's 17 seasons at Maine, the team won eight Maine State Series (a competition between Maine, Bowdoin, Colby, and Bates) and shared three other Yankee Conference titles, but did not qualify for another NCAA tournament.

Butterfield's players at Maine included Major Leaguers John Cumberland and Bert Roberge, college head coach Jack Leggett, baseball executive Bill Livesey, and New York Yankees manager Carl "Stump" Merrill. Butterfield coined Merrill's nickname during his freshman season in 1963.

=== South Florida ===
Following the 1974 season, Butterfield left Maine to become the head coach at South Florida (USF), in part due to tension with Maine's administration over the program's funding. He coached at USF for two seasons (1975–1976) and had an overall record of 61-24-1. At USF, future Toronto Blue Jays manager Carlos Tosca was Butterfield's equipment manager.

== Head coaching record ==
Below is a table of Butterfield's yearly records as a collegiate head baseball coach.

Record table
Season	Team	Overall	Conference	Standing	Postseason
Maine Black Bears (Yankee Conference) (1957–1974)
1957	Maine	6–14	3–5	T–3rd	
1958	Maine	12–9	5–3	3rd	
1959	Maine	12–8	7–3	2nd	
1960	Maine	12–8	8–2	T–1st	
1961	Maine	9–13–1	2–6–1	5th	
1962	Maine	9–14	5–5	3rd	
1963	Maine	9–12	4–5	4th	
1964	Maine	21–8	8–2	1st	College World Series
1965	Maine	14–7	6–4	T–3rd	
1966	Maine	15–9–1	7–3	T–1st	
1967	Maine	15–7	5–5	T–3rd	
1968	Maine	10–9	3–7	T–4th	
1969	Maine	12–12	6–4	T–2nd	
1970	Maine	18–6	8–2	T–1st	
1971	Maine	16–12	6–9	3rd	
1972	Maine	20–7	8–4	T–2nd	
1973	Maine	15–9	4–4	3rd	
1974	Maine	15–5	4–3	T–3rd	
Maine:		240–169–2	99–76–1		
South Florida Bulls (1975–1976)
1975	South Florida	29–12			
1976	South Florida	32–12–1			
South Florida:		61–24–1			
Total:		301–193–3			
National champion Postseason invitational champion Conference regular season champion Conference regular season and conference tournament champion Division regular season champion Division regular season and conference tournament champion Conference tournament champion

== Professional baseball ==
In 1976, Butterfield left USF at the request of Yankees owner George Steinbrenner to become a scout for New York. The following year, he was named the organization's Director of Player Development and Scouting, a position he served in for the next three seasons.

== Death ==
Early on November 16, 1979, Butterfield was killed when his car crashed into a street sweeper stopped in the fast lane of Route 17 in Paramus, New Jersey. The Yankee organization, already reeling from the death of Thurmon Munson the preceding summer, was devastated. Steinbrenner said of his death: "The magnitude of our loss cannot be expressed in words. He was the epitome of what you'd look for in a teacher of young men. His abilities were amply displayed by what he did for our farm system in three seasons, culminating in championships for all five of our farm teams last summer. I doubt that we will ever be able to replace Jack Butterfield. He was that great, and he was dedicated to the Yankees and the Yankee traditions."

== Personal ==
=== Family ===
Butterfield's son, Brian, played for him at Maine for one season and is currently a Major League Baseball coach for the Los Angeles Angels. Brian has also spent time as a coach with the Toronto Blue Jays and Boston Red Sox and in the Yankees and Diamondbacks minor league systems. Butterfield's brother, Jim, assisted him at Maine from 1957–1959 and later became the head football coach at Ithaca. Jim was inducted into the College Football Hall of Fame in 1997.

=== Awards named after ===
Following Butterfield's death in 1979, two awards were named for him. At Maine, the Jack Butterfield Memorial Scholarship is given to baseball players who "have demonstrated academic proficiency, athletic leadership and the high ideals and standards" of Butterfield. Past recipients include Major Leaguers Mike Bordick, Mark Sweeney, Bill Swift, and Larry Thomas. Also, the New England Intercollegiate Baseball Association (NEIBA) gives the Jack Butterfield Award to a coach who exhibits "integrity and dedication to the game." Past recipients include Maine's John Winkin, Vermont's Bill Currier, and Northeastern's Neil McPhee.
