= John Winkin =

American baseball coach (1919–2014)

- Winkin with Husson

Biographical details
- Born: July 24, 1919; Englewood, New Jersey, U.S.
- Died: July 19, 2014 (aged 94)
- Education: Duke University; Columbia University

Playing career

Baseball
- c. late 1930s: Duke

Men's soccer
- c. late 1930s: Duke

Men's basketball
- c. late 1930s: Duke
- Position: center fielder (baseball)

Coaching career (HC unless noted)

Football
- 1949–1953: Dwight Morrow HS (NJ)

Baseball
- 1949–1954: Dwight Morrow HS (NJ)
- 1955–1974: Colby
- 1975–1996: Maine
- 1997–2003: Husson (assistant)
- 2004–2007: Husson

Administrative career (AD unless noted)
- 1965–1974: Colby

Head coaching record
- Overall: 1043–706–16 (college baseball)

John W. Winkin Jr. (July 24, 1919 – July 19, 2014) was an American baseball coach, scout, broadcaster, journalist and collegiate athletics administrator. Winkin led the University of Maine Black Bears baseball team to six College World Series berths in an 11-year span. In 2007, at age 87, he was the oldest active head coach in any collegiate sport at any NCAA level. In all, 92 of his former players wound up signing professional baseball contracts. Elected to 11 different halls of fame, including the National College Baseball Hall of Fame in 2013, he finished his college baseball coaching career in 2008 with 1,043 total wins, which ranks 52nd all-time among NCAA head coaches. He died in 2014.

== Early life ==
Winkin was born July 24, 1919 in Englewood, New Jersey, the son of Cora Senner Winkin and John W. Winkin Sr. His mother was a physician. His father was a linguistics professor at Columbia University.

Winkin attended Dwight Morrow High School in Englewood.

Winkin attended Duke University, where he played baseball for head coach Jack Coombs as a 5-foot 6-inch left-handed hitting center fielder. He also played basketball and soccer and was a member of the Sigma Chi fraternity.

== Military service ==
Following graduation Winkin joined the U.S. Navy as an ensign, spending 56 months at sea in the Pacific theatre and rising to the rank of lieutenant commander.

Winkin served as one of 158 crew aboard the USS McCall, a destroyer assigned to protect aircraft carrier USS Enterprise. After delivering Marines to Wake Island, the fleet was returning to port at Pearl Harbor on the evening of December 6, 1941. However, the McCall was unable to make it in because of hazardous weather. If not for that storm, the ship would have been berthed next to the USS Arizona when Japanese forces attacked the next morning. Instead, Winkin and his crewmates saw the entire attack unfold from the decks of the McCall in the waters outside the harbor.

== Post-War life ==
Following his military discharge, Winkin returned to New Jersey. His college coach Coombs had suggested the coaching profession to Winkin, but he pursued a career in journalism, later becoming a founding editor of Sport Magazine. He was hired for a broadcasting position with the New York Yankees, where he hosted the first pre-game baseball TV show in the nation alongside Mel Allen and Curt Gowdy. Winkin became friends with Joe DiMaggio, and he chose to wear jersey #5 at each of his college coaching stints in honor of the Yankee legend. Winkin also made his first foray into coaching, becoming manager of the American Legion baseball team in Englewood.

In 1949 Winkin became head football coach at Dwight Morrow High School in Englewood, where he was also a baseball coach and history teacher. To appease his parents, Winkin resumed studies at Columbia University, earning his Master's and Doctorate in education. His doctoral thesis was on the statistical probabilities of the double play.

Among the rival schools Winkin coached against was St. Cecilia's, also in Englewood, where the head coach was Vince Lombardi. Winkin and the future Green Bay Packers legend became close friends and bridge partners.

== Colby College ==
In 1954, Coombs recommended Winkin to his alma mater, Colby College. Winkin spent the next 20 seasons as baseball coach. As an administrator he served as president of the Eastern College Athletic Conference, and also as a vice president of the National Collegiate Athletic Association.

Winkin was named National Baseball Coach of the Year in 1965. During his tenure he also served as an area scout for the Boston Red Sox for several years. He also developed a friendship with Ted Williams, and Winkin coached at Williams' summer youth baseball camps in Lakeville, Massachusetts, for 15 years.

Two of Winkin's players at Colby, Norm Gigon and Ed Phillips, went on to play in the major leagues.

As athletic director, Winkin hired Dick Whitmore as men's basketball coach in 1970. Whitmore compiled a 637–341 record and a .651 winning percentage over his 40-year career, and retired in March 2011 with the seventh-highest all-time victory total in NCAA Division III men's basketball.

In 1973–74, Winkin's final year at Colby, he served as president of the National Association of Collegiate Directors of Athletics. He compiled a record of 301–202–5 over his baseball coaching tenure with the school.

== University of Maine ==
Winkin became head baseball coach at the University of Maine in 1975, taking over for Jack Butterfield, who had left to become the head coach of South Florida. His arrival spawned an era of great success for the Black Bears that included six College World Series appearances and a third-place finish. Winkin's teams, composed largely of players from Maine and the other five New England states, proved to be formidable competition for major southern and western universities that had substantially larger budgets and fielded superior talent.

Maine's success on the national stage was even more surprising given the state's long winters that often resulted in snow-covered ground well into April and muddy fields in May. Conditions often limited the Black Bears outdoor on-campus baseball activity to less than two months, while players for colleges in warm-weather climates were able to train outdoors year-round. Maine, like other northern schools, would head south early in the season, playing multiple weeks worth of games on the road against top-caliber teams. Winkin also pioneered an innovative system of indoor baseball training and workouts, which he detailed in one of his books.

In 1975, Winkin's first season, the Black Bears set a school record with 25 wins and matched the team's best-ever .750 winning percentage, but lost in the NCAA regionals. Senior right-hander Fred Howard, a Butterfield recruit, went on to pitch in the majors with the Chicago White Sox.

In 1976 the Black Bears won a new team record 29 games and earned their first CWS berth under Winkin. It was also the school's first appearance in Omaha since 1964, when Butterfield led Maine to three wins and a third-place finish. Following a 3–2 loss to Eastern Michigan, Winkin's team knocked off heavily favored Auburn (9–8) and Washington State (6–3) before being eliminated by Arizona State (7–0). The 1976 team included future major leaguer Bert Roberge and future Clemson baseball coach Jack Leggett.

Maine returned to the CWS in 1981, arriving in Omaha as winners of 30 games including a 20-game winning streak. Notable players on the team included future major leaguers Kevin Buckley, Joe Johnson and Bill Swift. The Bears faced Miami in the opener, playing the Hurricanes at an even 1–1 through the first six innings behind Swift's pitching. However Miami scored five runs in the final three frames to win it, 6–1. Maine next played South Carolina in another tight game where the lead changed hands six times. The Bears gained a 7–6 edge with a pair of runs in the top of the 5th, but the Gamecocks scored six unanswered runs to win it, 12–7. Maine's loss eliminated them from the tournament, but their ability to play established power programs close impressed many observers.

The 1982 team had lost six of its first games that season, but had rattled off 22 wins in 23 games including sweeps in the ECAC New England Playoffs and NCAA Northeast Regionals to again qualify for the CWS. Maine faced another opening game against Miami, who knocked the previously unbeaten Swift out of the game with a seven-run onslaught in the second inning. The Black Bear relievers subdued the Hurricanes the rest of the way, but Maine's offense could only muster a pair of runs on the way to a 7–2 loss. Johnson led the Bears back to the winner's column with a 6–0 shutout over Cal State-Fullerton, and Maine reached the final three with an 8–5 win over Stanford and John Elway. Winkin's team found themselves in yet another matchup with Miami, with a championship date against Wichita State at stake. Maine stunned the Hurricanes early, knocking out starter Rob Souza with three runs, but reliever Eddie Escribano silenced the Bears' bats the rest of the way. Miami held a slim 4–3 lead but erupted for six runs in the top of the ninth to crush Maine's hopes. Winkin's Bears tacked on a futile run in the bottom half but were eliminated by the Canes, 10–4. First baseman Kevin Bernier became the first Maine player in the Winkin era to be named to the CWS All-Tournament Team.

Maine reached the CWS again in 1983, entering play with a 29–14 record. Barry Larkin had helped give Michigan a 6–2 lead with a pair of doubles in the opener, but the Black Bears made a spirited comeback with three runs in the bottom of the eighth inning. However it wasn't enough as the Wolverines held on for a 6–5 victory. Winkin's team then faced Arizona State, led by Barry Bonds. It was over early as the Sun Devils scored five times in the first two innings on the way to a 7–0 shutout that eliminated the Bears. Over the summer, Winkin coached the U.S. National Baseball Team that included USC slugger Mark McGwire.

Winkin's club got off to a dismal start in 1984, losing 11 of their first 13 games on a road trip that pitted them against powers such as Texas and Oklahoma. But Maine righted the ship, going 22–7 to once again reach the CWS with a 33–18 record. In their opener against Oklahoma State the Black Bears got off to a quick start, taking a 4–0 lead in the second inning. But Pete Incaviglia and Randy Whisler of Oklahoma State each drove in 3 runs and led OSU to a 9–5 comeback win. Maine once again was paired against Miami, their CWS nemesis. After losing 11 straight games to the Hurricanes, Winkin's Bears had finally beaten them by sweeping a two-game regular season series played earlier in the year on Maine's home field in Orono. However, in the tournament Miami again dominated, leading 8–1 after four innings and 13–3 through six. The Bears mounted a rally in the top of the ninth, scoring four runs, but UMaine was eliminated, 13–7.

The Black Bears set another school record for wins in 1985, going 38–17 with another win over Miami (Winkin's first when playing at the Florida school). However Maine suffered a pair of embarrassing defeats in the ECAC North Playoffs, losing to La Salle (10–2) and Long Island (4–1). Winkin's club failed to qualify for the NCAA playoffs for the first time since 1979.

The 1986 season brought a return to Omaha for the Black Bears. Despite losing 8 of their first 10 games, and 16 of 25, Maine won 40+ games for the first time in school history. The Bears arrived at the CWS sporting a 41–21 record under Winkin, led by future big leaguers Mike Bordick and Jeff Plympton. Plympton was joined in the Black Bears pitching rotation by Scott Morse, Steve Loubier and Dale Plummer, and all four would ultimately be drafted by major league clubs. The opening game of the CWS, against Arizona, would result in perhaps the most heartbreaking loss of Winkin's career. Behind the ace stuff of Morse and the booming bat of catcher Bill Reynolds, Maine built a 7–0 lead and still held a 7–1 margin in the bottom of the eighth inning. But it all fell apart as the Wildcats scored four runs in that frame on a pair of two-run homers by Gar Millay and Gary Alexander. In the last of the ninth Arizona's Mike Senne singled home a run, setting the stage for Dave Shermet to blast a two-out, two-run, game-winning home run that stunned the Bears, 8–7. The next game, Winkin's last in a College World Series, pitted Maine against Louisiana State. The Tigers built an early 6–0 lead, riding the bat of Jeff Yurtin who went 4-for-4 with five RBI and his 10th home run of the season. Maine out-hit LSU 11 to 8, but the Tigers turned four double plays to quash any potential rallies and hang on for an 8–4 win that eliminated the Black Bears. Despite the pair of losses, Reynolds was named to the All-Tournament Team.

Maine would field other strong teams during Winkin's tenure, but changes in NCAA tournament seeding procedures helped prevent the Bears from earning another trip to Omaha. Instead of each regional bracket being stocked with teams from the region, two of the top 16 national seeds would be assigned to each regional. This virtually assured that all eight College World Series slots would be filled by the traditional southern and western power schools from warm weather climates. In 1999 the odds became even longer for Maine when the NCAA abandoned neutral site regionals and assigned the top eight national seeds as host schools for each regional.

Others who played under Winkin at Maine and reached the major leagues included Mark Sweeney and Larry Thomas. Stump Merrill, an assistant coach at UMaine under Winkin, went on to manage the New York Yankees.

Winkin's tenure in Orono ended in 1996 when his contract was not renewed. His career coaching record at UMaine was 642-430-3.

== Husson University ==
In 1996 Winkin joined Husson University as an assistant under head baseball coach John Kolasinski. He also held the positions of senior lecturer and vice president for sports leadership as the school's first Fellow in Sports and Leadership. Winkin became head coach of the Eagles in November 2003 after Kolasinski departed to take a similar position at Siena Heights University.

On March 12, 2006, the 86-year-old Winkin became the 44th collegiate baseball coach to reach 1,000 career victories when Husson defeated Drew University 6–3 in Tampa, Florida.

On December 10, 2007, Winkin suffered a stroke while out on his daily walk in Bangor, Maine. The illness left him with partial paralysis of his right side and inhibited his speech. Winkin remained Husson's head coach for the 2008 season, but with his return uncertain in January the school appointed Jason Harvey as interim coach. Winkin officially stepped down after the season but remained as an assistant coach, with Harvey formally replacing him as head coach in July. While leading Husson, Winkin compiled an overall record of 100–74–8.

The Winkin Sports Complex at Husson University is named in his honor.

== Personal ==
Winkin was married and divorced before being widowed by his second wife in 1983 after 23 years of marriage. His third marriage also ended in divorce. He has two children, David and Mary, and eight grandchildren. He was Roman Catholic, an avid fan of swing-era jazz, and was affectionately nicknamed "Wink" by friends and former players.

Winkin developed close friendships with Red Sox CEO John Harrington and longtime Maine sports benefactor Harold Alfond, who was a Red Sox minority owner. Alfond's grandchildren came to call Winkin "Papa".

Winkin died on July 19, 2014, at the age of 94.

== Awards and honors ==
- Winkin is a member of the University of Maine Sports Hall of Fame, Husson University Sports Hall of Fame, American Baseball Coaches Association Hall of Fame, Maine Baseball Hall of Fame, and Maine Sports Hall of Fame.
- New England Division I Baseball Coach of the Year in 1975.
- In 1987, Winkin received the James Lynah Distinguished Achievement Award from the ECAC.
- In 1992, the Maine Baseball Coaches Association established the John W. Winkin Award, given annually to the best high school baseball player in the State of Maine.
- The University of Maine retired Winkin's jersey number 5 in 1999, making him the third baseball figure to be so honored by the school.
- As part of a 1999 commemorative series covering every U.S. state, Sports Illustrated magazine ranked Winkin among The 50 Greatest Maine Sports Figures, placing him at #16.
- In 2000 and 2001 Winkin donated $250,000 to upgrade the Husson baseball facilities. The facility is now called the Dr. John W. Winkin Sports Complex.
- On October 19, 2009, Husson University inducted Coach Winkin into its Sports Hall of Fame.
- Coach Winkin served as a chairman at the NCAA's Regional and Super Regional tournament sites for 10 years.
- On April 11, 2013, Winkin was announced as a member of the 2013 induction class for the National College Baseball Hall of Fame. He had been an annual nominee since 2007, the year after the hall's establishment. Winkin was present for the induction ceremonies in Lubbock, Texas, on June 29, 2013.

== Published books ==
- The Baseball Coaching Bible
- Maximizing Baseball Practice
- Maximizing Baseball Practice Indoors
