= America East Conference baseball awards =

At the end of each regular season, the America East Conference names major award winners in baseball. Currently, it names a Coach, Pitcher, Player, and Rookie of the Year. With the exception of Rookie of the Year, which was added in 1996, the awards date to the 1990 season, the conference's first season of baseball. Through the 1996 season, the awards were known as the major awards of the North Atlantic Conference, the America East's former name.

Through the end of the 2019 season, Stony Brook has won 21 major awards, the most of any school in the conference. Maine has the second highest total, with 20. Three other schools have at least ten: Binghamton (19), Delaware (17), and Vermont (10).

In the conference's 25–year history, a single team has swept the awards six times. Three instances came before 1996 (when the conference Rookie of the Year was added as the fourth award): Central Connecticut in 1990 and Delaware in 1992 and 1995. Since 1996, Stony Brook swept the awards in 2011 and 2012, and Hartford did so in 2018.

== Coach of the Year ==
The conference's Coach of the Year award is presented annually to its most outstanding baseball coach, as chosen by a vote of the conference's coaches at the end of the regular season. The award was first presented in 1990 and was known as the North Atlantic Conference Coach of the Year award through the 1996 season, after which the conference adopted its current name.

In 2014, Stony Brook's Matt Senk won the award for the third time, after the Seawolves went 33–16 in the regular season and won the America East's regular season title. Senk won four awards in five years from 2011 to 2015. 2014 was the sixth consecutive season in which the award was presented to the coach whose team won the conference's regular season title.

Binghamton head coach Tim Sinicki has won the most Coach of the Year awards, with seven.

Maine is the only school to have multiple coaches win the award. Paul Kostacopoulos won it in 1997 and 2001, Steve Trimper won it in 2013, and Nick Derba won it in 2022 and 2023.

=== Winners by season ===
The following is a table of the award's winners in each season since it was inaugurated in 1990. The table also includes the winner's school, conference record and rank in the standings, and overall record.

Season	Coach	School	Conf. (Rk.)	Overall
1990	George Redman	Central Connecticut	9–5 (2nd)	25–14
1991	Neil McPhee	Northeastern	12–3 (2nd)	35–15
1992	Bob Hannah	Delaware	14–13 (3rd)	28–21
1993	Dave Bettencourt	New Hampshire	15–10 (2nd)	23–20
1994	Neil McPhee (2)	Northeastern	18–6 (2nd)	35–16
1995	Bob Hannah (2)	Delaware	19–3 (1st)	45–14
1996	Bob Hannah (3)	Delaware	19–5 (1st)	44–12
1997	Paul Kostacopoulos	Maine	16–8 (2nd)	24–27
1998	Bob Hannah (4)	Delaware	22–2 (1st)	43–10
1999	Mike Gottlieb	Towson	20–7 (1st)	33–19
2000	Bob Hannah (5)	Delaware	19–5 (1st)	37–20
2001	Paul Kostacopoulos (2)	Maine	20–8 (2nd)	36–15
2002	Bill Currier	Vermont	14–8 (2nd)	27–22
2003	Bill Currier (2)	Vermont	17–5 (1st)	32–14
2004	Jon Mueller	Albany	14–7 (T–2nd)	37–14
2005	Tim Sinicki	Binghamton	12–8 (4th)	23–26
2006	Bill Currier (3)	Vermont	16–8 (1st)	19–32
2007	Tim Sinicki (2)	Binghamton	17–5 (1st)	28–19
2008	John Jancuska	UMBC	13–11 (3rd)	21–29
2009	Tim Sinicki (3)	Binghamton	13–7 (1st)	30–22
2010	Tim Sinicki (4)	Binghamton	21–3 (1st)	31–20
2011	Matt Senk	Stony Brook	22–2 (1st)	42–12
2012	Matt Senk (2)	Stony Brook	21–3 (1st)	52–15
2013	Steve Trimper	Maine	20–9 (1st)	37–22
2014	Matt Senk (3)	Stony Brook	18–5 (1st)	35–18
2015	Matt Senk (4)	Stony Brook	18–4–1 (1st)	35–16–1
2016	Tim Sinicki (5)	Binghamton	19–5 (1st)	30–25
2017	Tim Sinicki (6)	Binghamton	15–4 (1st)	30–13
2018	Justin Blood	Hartford	16–8 (1st)	26–31
2019	Jon Mueller (2)	Albany	14–9 (2nd)	28–21
2021	Jon Mueller (3)	Albany	20–18 (1st)	22–25
2022	Nick Derba	Maine	21–9 (1st)	27–22
2023	Nick Derba (2)	Maine	19–5 (1st)	32–21
2024	Ryan Klosterman	Bryant	17–7 (1st)	36–21
2025	Ryan Klosterman (2)	Bryant	18–6 (1st)	36–19–1
2026	Tim Sinicki (7)	Binghamton	17–7 (1st)	28–20
2026	Liam Bowen	UMBC	15–9 (2nd)	28–22

=== Winners by school ===
The following is a table of the schools whose coaches have won the award, along with the year each school joined the conference, the number of times it has won the award, and the years in which it has done so.

School (year joined)	Awards	Seasons
Binghamton (2002)	7	2005, 2007, 2009, 2010, 2016, 2017, 2026
Delaware (1992) (Note: Following the 2001 season, Delaware left the America East to join the Colonial Athletic Association.)	5	1992, 1995, 1996, 1998, 2000
Maine (1990)	5	1997, 2001, 2013, 2022, 2023
Stony Brook (2002) (Note: Following the 2022 season, Stony Brook left the America East to join the Colonial Athletic Association.)	4	2011, 2012, 2014, 2015
Albany (2002)	3	2004, 2019, 2021
Vermont (1990) (Note: Vermont cut its baseball program following the 2009 season.)	3	2002, 2003, 2006
Bryant (2023)	2	2024, 2025
Northeastern (1990) (Note: Following the 2005 season, Northeastern left the America East to join the Colonial Athletic Association.)	2	1991, 1994
UMBC (2004)	2	2008, 2026
Central Connecticut (1990) (Note: Following the 1990 season, Central Connecticut left the NAC to join the East Coast Conference.)	1	1990
Hartford (1990) (Note: Hartford left the America East following the 2022 season.)	1	2018
New Hampshire (1990) (Note: New Hampshire cut its baseball program following the 1997 season.)	1	1993
Towson (1996) (Note: Following the 2001 season, Towson left the America East to re-join the Colonial Athletic Association.)	1	1999

== Pitcher of the Year ==
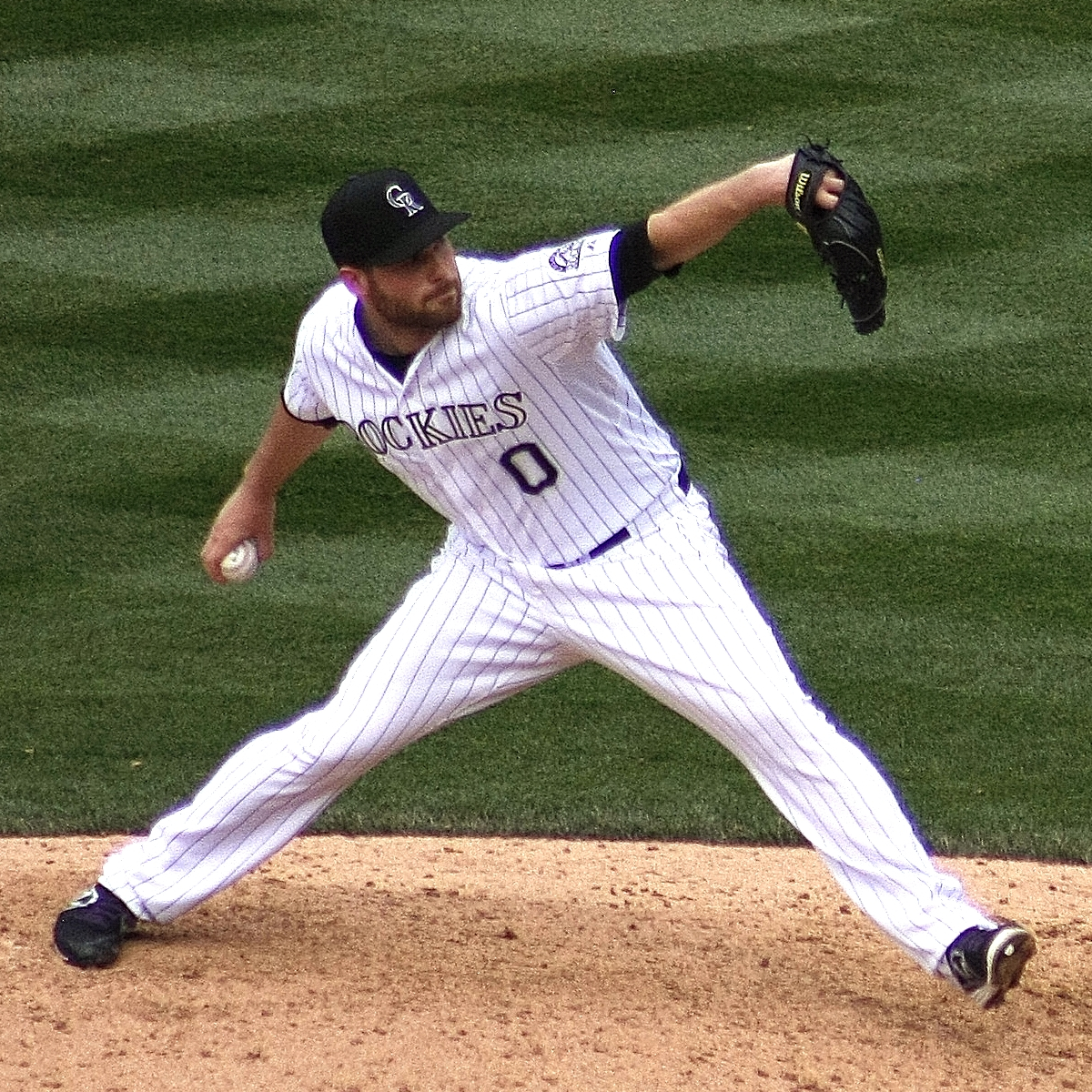
2005 winner Adam Ottavino while pitching for MLB's Colorado Rockies.

The conference's Pitcher of the Year award is given annually to the best pitcher in the America East, as chosen by a vote of the conference's coaches at the end of the regular season. The award was first presented in 1990 and was known as the North Atlantic Conference Pitcher of the Year award through the 1996 season, after which the conference adopted its current name.

Hartford pitcher Sean Newcomb won the award in 2014. Newcomb went 8–2 with a 1.25 ERA on the year. He was the first Hawk to receive the award and was selected in the first round of the 2014 MLB draft by the Los Angeles Angels. Newcomb became the first pitcher in the America East to be selected in the first round.

Stony Brook's Nick Tropeano is the only pitcher to win the award twice. He won the award in both 2010 (when he shared it with Binghamton's James Guglietti) and 2011.

Four of the award's winners – Maine's Larry Thomas, Northeastern's Adam Ottavino, Stony Brook's Nick Tropeano, and Hartford's Sean Newcomb – have gone on to pitch in MLB.

=== Winners by season ===
The following is a table of the award's winners in each season since it was inaugurated in 1990.

Season	Pitcher	School
1990	David Adam	Central Connecticut
1991	Larry Thomas	Maine
1992	Jason Pierson	Delaware
1993	Mark Ballard	Maine
1994	Jeremy Benson	Delaware
1995	Jamie Wilson	Delaware
1996	Justin Romano	Hofstra
1997	Garrett Quinn	Maine
1998	Matt Phillips	Delaware
1999	Greg Montalbano	Northeastern
2000	Rich McGuire	Delaware
2001	Rusty Tucker	Maine
2002	Mike MacDonald	Maine
2003	Jamie Merchant	Vermont
2004	Jordan Thomson	Northeastern
2005	Adam Ottavino	Northeastern
2006	Zach Groh	Binghamton
2007	Gary Novakowski	Stony Brook
2008	Joe Serafin	Vermont
2009	Murphy Smith	Binghamton
2010	James Giulietti	Binghamton
2010	Nick Tropeano	Stony Brook
2011	Nick Tropeano	Stony Brook
2012	Tyler Johnson	Stony Brook
2013	Tommy Lawrence	Maine
2014	Sean Newcomb	Hartford
2015	Conrad Wozniak	UMBC
2016	Mike Bunal	Binghamton
2017	Nick Gallagher	Binghamton
2018	Nicholas Dombkoski	Hartford
2019	Ben Anderson	Binghamton
2021	Nicholas Sinacola	Maine
2022	Ryan Fischer	NJIT
2023	Luke Johnson	UMBC
2024	Luke Johnson	UMBC
2025	Caleb Leys	Maine
2026	Dylan Banner	Albany

=== Winners by school ===
The following is a table of the schools whose pitchers have won the award, along with the year each school joined the conference, the number of times it has won the award, and the years in which it has done so.

School (year joined)	Awards	Seasons
Maine (1990)	8	1991, 1993, 1997, 2001, 2002, 2013, 2021, 2025
Binghamton (2002)	6	2006, 2009, 2010, 2016, 2017, 2019
Delaware (1992) (Note: Delaware left following the 2001 season to join the Colonial Athletic Association.)	5	1992, 1994, 1995, 1998, 2000
Stony Brook (2002) (Note: Stony Brook left following the 2022 season to join the Colonial Athletic Association.)	4	2007, 2010, 2011, 2012
Northeastern (1990) (Note: Northeastern left following the 2005 season to join the Colonial Athletic Association.)	3	1999, 2004, 2005
UMBC (2004)	3	2015, 2023, 2024
Hartford (1990) (Note: Hartford left the America East following the 2022 season.)	2	2014, 2018
Vermont (1990) (Note: Vermont cut its baseball program after the 2009 season.)	2	2003, 2008
Albany (2002)	1	2026
Central Connecticut (1990) (Note: Central Connecticut left after the 1990 season to join the East Coast Conference.)	1	1990
Hofstra (1995) (Note: Hofstra left after the 2001 season to join the Colonial Athletic Association.)	1	1996
NJIT (2021)	1	2022

== Player of the Year ==
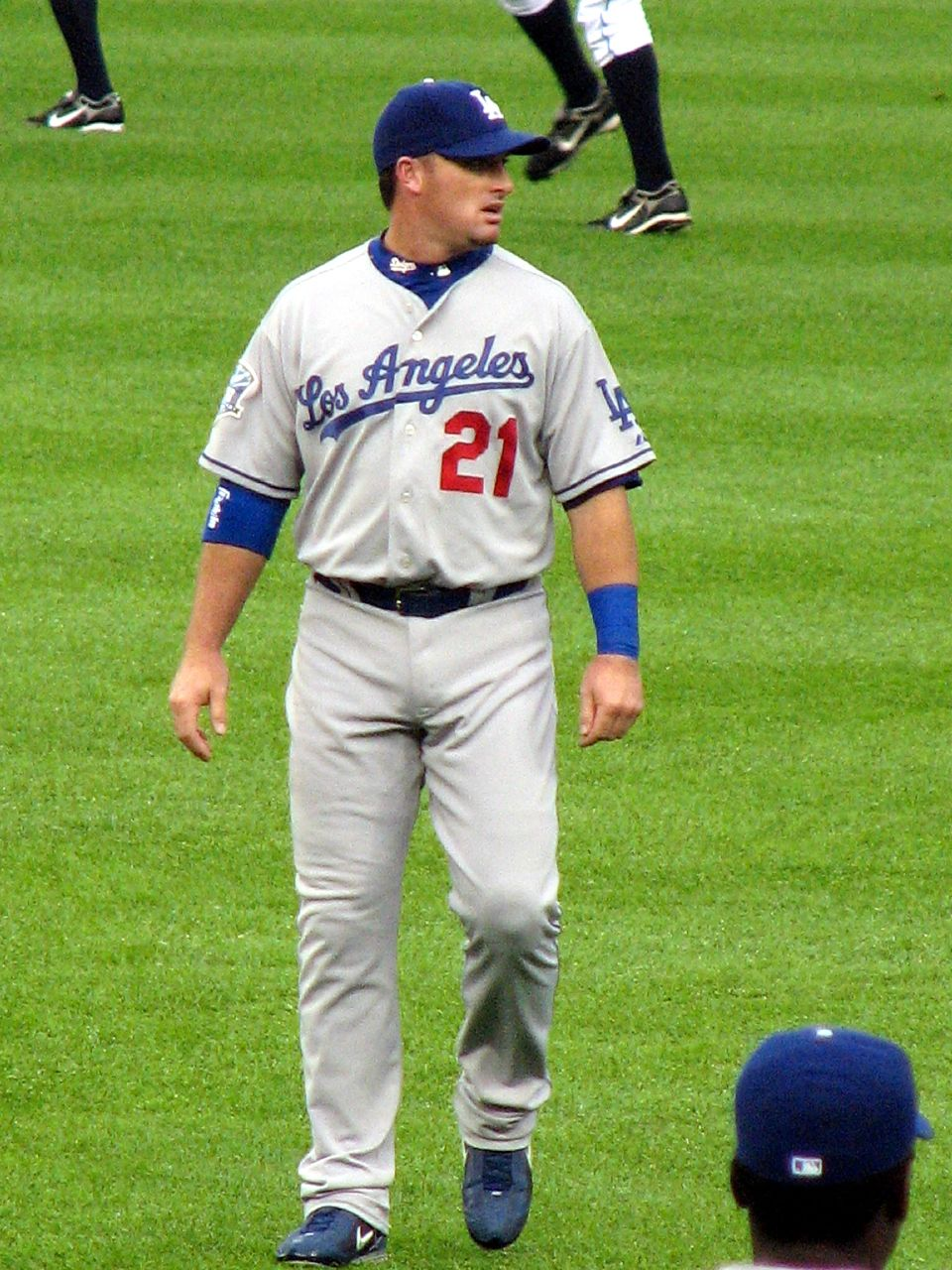
1991 recipient Mark Sweeney.

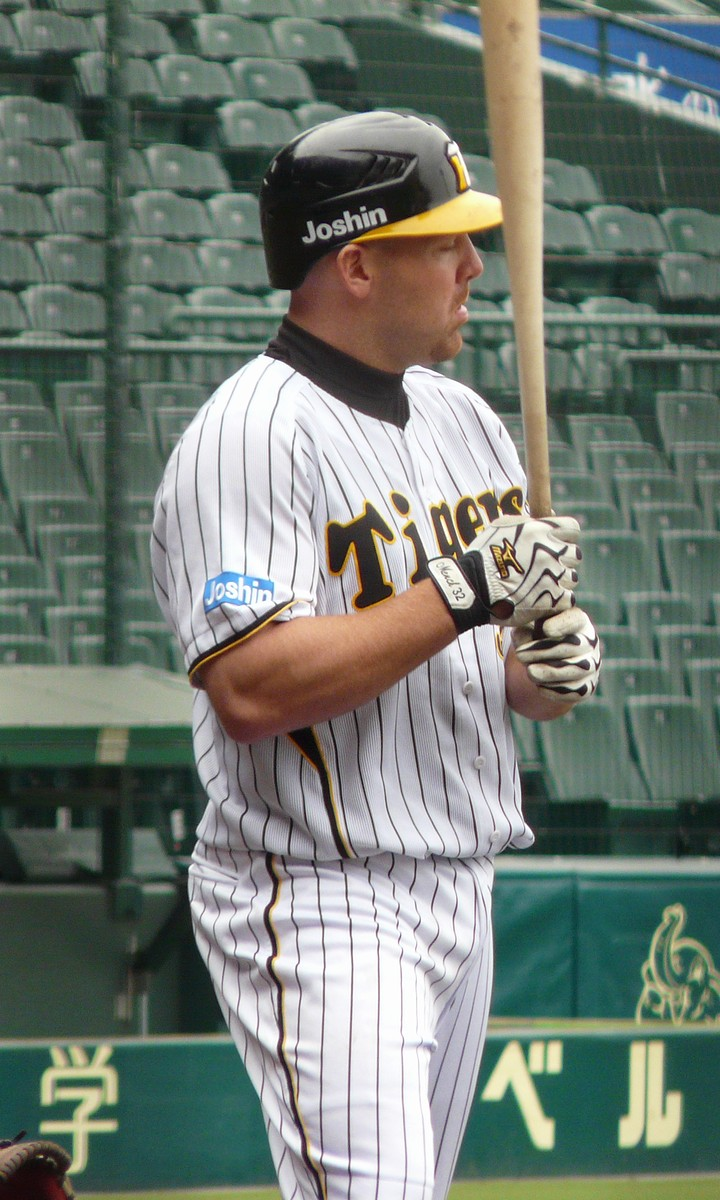
1998 and 1999 recipient Kevin Mench.

The conference's Len Harlow Player of the Year award is given annually to the best pitcher in the America East, as chosen by a vote of the conference's coaches at the end of the regular season. The award was first presented in 1990 and was known as the North Atlantic Conference Player of the Year award through the 1996 season, after which the conference adopted its current name. It is named for Len Harlow, who worked in athletic communications for Maine and the conference.

In 2012, Stony Brook outfielder Travis Jankowski became the first America East Player of the Year award winner to be drafted in the first round of the MLB Draft, and the second America East player overall after Northeastern's Carlos Peña.

Delaware's Kevin Mench is the only player to win the award twice. He did so in 1998 and 1999.

Five recipients – Maine's Mark Sweeney, Delaware's Cliff Brumbaugh, Mench, Vermont's Matt Duffy, and Stony Brook's Travis Jankowski – have appeared in MLB.

=== Winners by season ===
The following is a table of the award's winners in each season since it was inaugurated in 1990.

Season	Pitcher	School	Ref
1990	Mike Sciortino	Central Connecticut	
1991	Mark Sweeney	Maine	
1992	Brian Wallace	Delaware	
1993	Chad White	Maine	
1994	Derek Gauthier	Northeastern	
1995	Cliff Brumbaugh	Delaware	
1996	James Vallillo	Towson	
1997	Brian August	Delaware	
1998	Kevin Mench	Delaware	
1999	Kevin Mench	Delaware	
2000	Andrew Salvo	Delaware	
2001	Gregg Davies	Towson	
2002	Jeff Barry	Vermont	
2003	Bobby Tewksbury	Vermont	
2004	Dan Schoonmaker	Albany	
2005	Mathieu Bergeron	Binghamton	
2006	Kyle Brault	Vermont	
2007	Brendon Hitchcock	Binghamton	
2008	Curt Smith	Maine	
2009	Matt Duffy	Vermont	
2010	Corey Taylor	Binghamton	
2011	Willie Carmona	Stony Brook	
2012	Travis Jankowski	Stony Brook	
2013	Michael Fransoso	Maine	
2014	Kevin Krause	Stony Brook	
2015	Jack Parenty	Stony Brook	
2016	David MacKinnon	Hartford	
2017	Toby Handley	Stony Brook	
2018	Nick Campana Sr.	Hartford	
2019	Nick Grande	Stony Brook	
2021	John Thrasher	Hartford	
2022	Evan Giordano	Stony Brook	
2023	Jeremiah Jenkins	Maine	
2024	Gavin Noriega	Bryant	
2025	Drew Wyers	Bryant	
2026	Ehi Okojie	UMBC	

=== Winners by school ===
The following is a table of the schools whose players have won the award, along with the year each school joined the conference, the number of times it has won the award, and the years in which it has done so.

School (year joined)	Awards	Seasons
Stony Brook (2002) (Note: Stony Brook left following the 2022 season to join the Colonial Athletic Association.)	7	2011, 2012, 2014, 2015, 2017, 2019, 2022
Delaware (1992) (Note: Delaware left after the 2001 season to join the Colonial Athletic Association.)	6	1992, 1995, 1997, 1998, 1999, 2000
Maine (1990)	5	1991, 1993, 2008, 2013, 2023
Vermont (1990) (Note: Vermont cut its baseball program following the 2009 season.)	4	2002, 2003, 2006, 2009
Binghamton (2002)	3	2005, 2007, 2010
Hartford (1990) (Note: Hartford left the America East following the 2022 season.)	3	2016, 2018, 2021
Bryant (2023)	2	2024, 2025
Towson (1996) (Note: Towson left after the 2001 season to re-join the Colonial Athletic Association.)	2	1996, 2001
Albany (2002)	1	2004
Central Connecticut (1990) (Note: Central Connecticut left after the 1990 season to join the East Coast Conference.)	1	1990
Northeastern (1990) (Note: Northeastern left after the 2005 season to join the Colonial Athletic Association.)	1	1994
UMBC (2004)	1	2026

== Rookie of the Year ==
The conference's Rookie of the Year award is given annually to the best freshman in the America East, as chosen by a vote of the conference's coaches at the end of the regular season. The award was added in 1996.

In 2014, Stony Brook closer Cameron Stone won the award. In the regular season, he had a 1.48 ERA and eight saves. He was the fifth consecutive Seawolf to win the award.

Two of the award's recipients – Delaware's Kevin Mench and Binghamton's Scott Diamond – later played in MLB.

=== Winners by season ===
The following is a table of the award's winners in each season since it was inaugurated in 1990. The table also includes the winner's school, conference record and rank in the standings, and overall record.

Season	Pitcher	School
1996	Lou Marchetti	Drexel
1997	Kevin Mench	Delaware
1998	Bruce Boehm	Drexel
1999	Mike Ross	Maine
2000	Joe Drapeau	Maine
2001	Mike Collar	Maine
2002	Jon Lewis	Stony Brook
2003	Greg Norton	Maine
2004	Miguel Magrass	Vermont
2005	Scott Diamond	Binghamton
2006	Kevin McAvoy	Maine
2007	Myckie Lugbauer	Maine
2008	Peter Bregartner	Binghamton
2009	David Ciocchi	Binghamton
2010	Willie Carmona	Stony Brook
2011	Brandon McNitt	Stony Brook
2012	Cole Peragine	Stony Brook
2013	Jack Parenty	Stony Brook
2014	Cameron Stone	Stony Brook
2015	Justin Courtney	Maine
2016	Bret Clarke	Stony Brook
2017	Christian Torres	UMBC
2018	Nicholas Dombkoski	Hartford
2019	Thomas Babalis	Binghamton
2021	Albert Choi	NJIT
2022	Evin Sullivan	Binghamton
2023	Leewood Molessa	UMBC
2024	Cade Ladehoff	NJIT
2025	Michael Belcher	Bryant
2026	Hunter St. Denis	Maine

=== Winners by school ===
The following is a table of the schools whose players have won the award, along with the year each school joined the conference, the number of times it has won the award, and the years in which it has done so.

School (year joined)	Awards	Seasons
Maine (1990)	8	1999, 2000, 2001, 2003, 2006, 2007, 2015, 2026
Stony Brook (2002) (Note: Stony Brook left following the 2022 season to join the Colonial Athletic Association.)	7	2002, 2010, 2011, 2012, 2013, 2014, 2016
Binghamton (2002)	5	2005, 2008, 2009, 2019, 2022
Drexel (1992) (Note: Drexel left after the 2001 season to join the Colonial Athletic Association.)	2	1996, 1998
NJIT (2021)	2	2021, 2024
UMBC (2004)	2	2017, 2023
Bryant (2023)	1	2025
Delaware (1992) (Note: Delaware left after the 2001 season to join the Colonial Athletic Association.)	1	1997
Hartford (1990) (Note: Hartford left the America East following the 2022 season.)	1	2018
Vermont (1990) (Note: Vermont cut its baseball program after the 2009 season.)	1	2004
