= Fred Howard (baseball) =

American baseball player (born 1956)

- Pitcher
- Born: September 2, 1956 (age 69); Portland, Maine
- Batted: Right Threw: Right

MLB debut
- May 26, 1979, for the Chicago White Sox

Last MLB appearance
- September 25, 1979, for the Chicago White Sox

MLB statistics
- Record: 1-5
- Earned Run Average: 3.57
- Appearances: 28
- Stats at Baseball Reference

Teams
- Chicago White Sox (1979)

Fred Irving Howard (born September 2, 1956) is a former American professional baseball pitcher with the Chicago White Sox of Major League Baseball. Howard was born in Portland, Maine and attended the University of Maine, where he played college baseball for the Maine Black Bears baseball team in 1975. He was drafted in the 6th round of the 1976 amateur draft by the White Sox and made he debut on May 26, 1979. His final MLB game was September 6, 1979. During his lone MLB season, he appeared in 28 games, starting 6, and finished with a 1–5 record. His ERA was 3.57 over 68 innings.

He played in the minor league system of Chicago from 1976–1983, including with the GCL White Sox, Appleton Foxes, Iowa Oaks, Knoxville Sox, and Glens Falls White Sox. He then attended the University of Missouri School of Medicine and became a general surgeon. He practices in Lake Wales, Florida.
