= Ralph Pond =

American baseball player (1888–1947)

- Outfielder
- Born: May 4, 1888; Eau Claire, Wisconsin, U.S.
- Died: September 8, 1947 (aged 59); Cleveland, Ohio, U.S.
- Batted: Unknown Threw: Right

MLB debut
- June 8, 1910, for the Boston Red Sox

Last MLB appearance
- June 8, 1910, for the Boston Red Sox

MLB statistics
- Batting average: .250
- Home runs: 0
- Runs batted in: 0
- Stats at Baseball Reference

Teams
- Boston Red Sox (1910)

Ralph Benjamin Pond (May 4, 1888 – September 8, 1947) was an American professional baseball outfielder who played briefly for the Boston Red Sox during the 1910 season. Pond threw right-handed (batting side unknown). A native of Eau Claire, Wisconsin, he attended the University of Maine, where he played college baseball for the Black Bears from 1909–1910.

Pond was a major leaguer whose career, statistically speaking, was only slightly different from that of Moonlight Graham. On June 8, 1910, he started at center field for Boston in a 5–4 defeat to the Chicago White Sox at South Side Park. He hit a single in four at-bats and stole one base, while committing an error in his only fielding chance. After that, he never appeared in a major league game again.

Pond died at the age of 59 in Cleveland, Ohio.

== See also ==
- Cup of coffee
