= Harvey Cushman =

American baseball player (1877–1920)

- Pitcher
- Born: July 5, 1877; Rockland, Maine, U.S.
- Died: December 27, 1920 (aged 43); Emsworth, Pennsylvania, U.S.
- Batted: Unknown Threw: Unknown

MLB debut
- August 24, 1902, for the Pittsburgh Pirates

Last MLB appearance
- September 5, 1902, for the Pittsburgh Pirates

MLB statistics
- Win–loss record: 0–4
- Earned run average: 7.36
- Strikeouts: 12
- Stats at Baseball Reference

Teams
- Pittsburgh Pirates (1902)

Harvey Barnes Cushman (July 5, 1877 – December 27, 1920) was an American professional baseball pitcher with the Pittsburgh Pirates of Major League Baseball, with whom he played for in 1902. He was born in Rockland, Maine, and played college baseball at Maine for one season (1897).
