= Steve Trimper =

American college baseball coach

Biographical details
- Born: Newton, New Jersey, U.S.
- Education: Eastern Connecticut '92 (B.A.); Vermont '97 (M.A.)

Playing career
- 1989: Elon
- 1990–1992: Eastern Connecticut

Coaching career (HC unless noted)
- 1993–1994: Wentworth (asst.)
- 1995–1998: Vermont (asst.)
- 1999–2005: Manhattan
- 2006–2016: Maine
- 2017–2026: Stetson

Head coaching record
- Overall: 786–692–4 (.532)
- Tournaments: NCAA: 6–6; NCAA Super Regionals: 0–2; America East: 13–14; Atlantic Sun: 16–8

Accomplishments and honors

Championships
- 2x ASUN regular season: 2018, 2024; 3x ASUN Tournament: 2018, 2024, 2025; America East regular season: 2013; ASUN Gold Division: 2025; 2x America East Tournament: 2006, 2011

Awards
- ASUN Coach of the Year: 2018; America East Coach of the Year: 2013; MAAC Coach of the Year: 2002

Steve Trimper is an American college baseball coach who recently was the head coach for the Stetson Hatters baseball team out of the ASUN Conference. Previously, he served as the head coach at Maine from 2006 to 2016 and Manhattan from 1999 to 2005. An alumnus of Eastern Connecticut State University, Trimper played baseball there from 1990 to 1992 and was a member of the Warriors' 1990 Division III national championship team.

== Coaching career ==
=== Assistant coaching ===
After he graduated from Eastern Connecticut in 1992, Trimper worked for two years as the associate head coach at Division III Wentworth. His first Division I position came at Vermont, where he served as an assistant under head coach Bill Currier from 1995 to 1998. He also earned his master's degree in administration from the university in 1997.

During the summers of 1996 and 1997, Trimper was the head coach of the Eastern Tides of the New England Collegiate Baseball League.

=== Manhattan ===
Trimper replaced Gary Puccio as the head coach at Manhattan prior to the start of the 1999 season. In his seven years as head coach (1999–2005), the Jaspers went 172–174–2.

Manhattan finished with sub-.500 records in Trimper's first three seasons. In 2002, his fourth, the team went 32–19; it was the school's first 30-win season and first winning season since 1971. Trimper was named the 2002 MAAC Coach of the Year. In 2003, the Jaspers finished with a .500 record (26–26), but went 15–10 in the MAAC to qualify for their first postseason appearance under Trimper. This berth was the first of three consecutive MAAC Tournaments for Manhattan; the team's best showing was a runner-up finish in 2004.

During Trimper's time at Manhattan, two of his players were named MAAC Rookie of the Year: first basemen Chris Gaskin in 2002 and Matt Rizzotti in 2005. Rizzotti was also named the 2005 MAAC Player of the Year. Trimper also had two players selected in the MLB draft: Gaskin and pitcher Mike Parisi, both in 2004. Parisi later pitched for the St. Louis Cardinals.

=== Maine ===
When Maine head coach Paul Kostacopoulos left for Navy after the 2005 season, the school hired Trimper to replace him. Trimper became the 24th head coach of Maine baseball.

In 2006, Trimper's first season, Maine qualified for the NCAA tournament. After a 32–20–1 (13–9 AEC) regular season, third baseman Kevin McAvoy was named America East Rookie of the Year, and Maine was seeded third in the America East tournament. The Black Bears swept through the tournament, defeating Stony Brook, Vermont, and Stony Brook again to win the championship and the conference's automatic bid to the NCAA tournament. At the Chapel Hill Regional, Maine went 0–2, losing 15–7 to top-seeded North Carolina and 21–19 to third-seeded UNC Wilmington.

The team went 1–2 in the conference tournament in 2007 and missed it in 2008 and 2009. The team had two more major award winners during this stretch: catcher Myckie Lugbauer won the program's second straight America East Rookie of the Year award in 2007, and outfielder Curt Smith was named conference Player of the Year in 2008.

From 2010 to 2014, Maine made five consecutive America East Tournament appearances. In 2011, it finished second in the conference and made its second NCAA tournament under Trimper. After a 29–22 regular season, the Black Bears swept through the America East tournament, defeating Binghamton, Stony Brook, and Albany. Sent to the Chapel Hill Regional as a four-seed for the second tournament in a row, the team went 1–2; it lost its opener to host North Carolina, but eliminated second-seed FIU before being eliminated by James Madison. In 2013, Trimper got his 400th career win, and Maine won the America East's regular season championship before losing to Binghamton in the tournament finals. The 2013 team won several major awards– Trimper was named America East Coach of the Year, shortstop Michael Fransoso was named Player of the Year, and Tommy Lawrence was named Pitcher of the Year.

Between 2006 and 2013, nine of Trimper's players have been selected in the MLB Draft. The highest selection was pitcher Jeff Gibbs, a ninth-round by the Arizona Diamondbacks in 2012.

=== Stetson ===
In December 2016, Trimper was named the head coach for the Stetson Hatters baseball team. Stetson University Director of Athletics Jeff Altier introduced Steve Trimper as the 23rd head baseball coach in the history of the Hatters baseball program on December 21, 2016, at a news conference in the Hall of Fame room at the Edmunds Center.

Trimper made his second season(2018) at Stetson one to remember after leading the Hatters to a second-place finish in his inaugural run through the ASUN Conference.

In 2018 the Hatters rewrote much of the Stetson Baseball record book. The list of team and individual accomplishments was considerable. Overall record: 48-11- tied for most wins in a season in program history. ASUN record: 15-3 (1st place). ASUN Tournament: 4-0 (Champions). NCAA DeLand Regional: 3-0 (Champions)- first regional title in program history. Home Record: 32-3 best in Melching Field history. Finished season ranked in every national poll: Baseball America (12), Collegiate Baseball (10), USA Today Coaches Poll (13), D1Baseball.com (10). Finished the 2018 season with a program record NCAA final RPI (7)

Six Hatters were selected in the MLB Draft in June, including Logan Gilbert by Seattle, who was selected in the 1st round (#16 overall)

== Head coaching records ==
=== NCAA ===
Below is a table of Trimper's yearly records as a collegiate head baseball coach.

Record table
Season	Team	Overall	Conference	Standing	Postseason
Manhattan Jaspers (Metro Atlantic Athletic Conference) (1999–2005)
1999	Manhattan	22–27	12–14	4th (South)	
2000	Manhattan	20–29	10–16	8th	
2001	Manhattan	20–25–1	9–15	7th	
2002	Manhattan	32–19	16–11	5th	
2003	Manhattan	26–26	15–10	4th	
2004	Manhattan	25–27–1	16–9	T-2nd	
2005	Manhattan	27–21	15–8	T-3rd	
Manhattan:		172–174–2	93–83		
Maine Black Bears (America East Conference) (2006–2016)
2006	Maine	35–22–1	13–9	3rd	NCAA Regional
2007	Maine	22–31	12–11	4th	
2008	Maine	20–28–1	8–15	7th	
2009	Maine	32–23	13–11	5th	
2010	Maine	34–22	17–7	2nd	
2011	Maine	33–24	18–6	2nd	NCAA Regional
2012	Maine	28–28	11–11	4th	
2013	Maine	37–22	20–9	1st	
2014	Maine	24–29	10–11	T-4th	
2015	Maine	24–28	10–10	T-3rd	
2016	Maine	20–35	8–15	6th	
Maine:		309–292–2	140–115		
Stetson Hatters (ASUN Conference) (2017–2026)
2017	Stetson	27–29	15–6	2nd	ASUN tournament
2018	Stetson	48–11	15–3	1st	NCAA Super Regional
2019	Stetson	27–32	11–12	6th	ASUN tournament runner up
2020	Stetson	11–4			Season canceled on March 12 due to Coronavirus pandemic
2021	Stetson	26–23	10–8	3rd (South)	ASUN tournament
2022	Stetson	26–29	10–20	6th (East)	
2023	Stetson	35–23	20–10	2nd	ASUN tournament
2024	Stetson	41–22	20–10	T–1st	NCAA Regional
2025	Stetson	41–21	24–6	1st (Graphite)	NCAA Regional
2026	Stetson	23–32	13–16	4th (Graphite)	ASUN tournament
Stetson:		305–226 (.574)	138–91 (.603)		
Total:		786–692–4 (.532)			
National champion Postseason invitational champion Conference regular season champion Conference regular season and conference tournament champion Division regular season champion Division regular season and conference tournament champion Conference tournament champion

=== Collegiate summer ===
Below is a table of Trimper's records as a collegiate summer baseball head coach.

Season	Team	Record	Standing	playoffs
1996	Eastern	13–26	5th	
1997	Eastern	17–23	6th	
Total		30–49		

== See also ==
- List of current NCAA Division I baseball coaches
