= Kevin Mench =

American baseball player (born 1978)

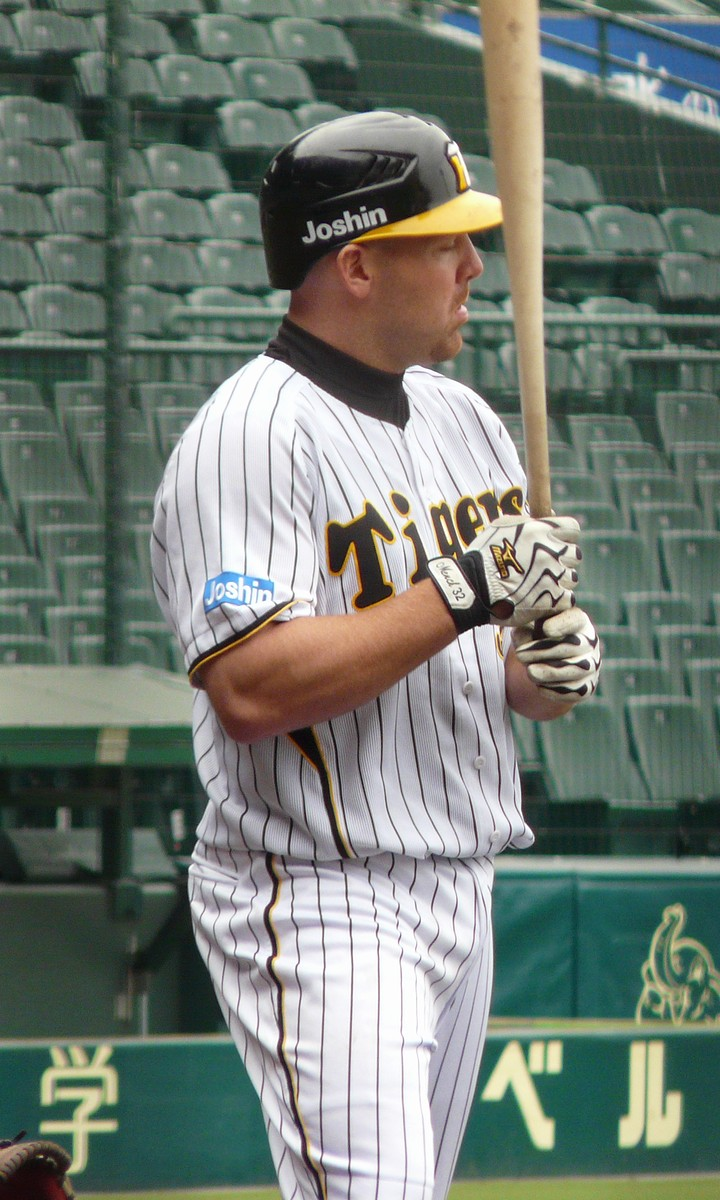
- Mench with the Hanshin Tigers
- Outfielder
- Born: January 7, 1978 (age 48); Wilmington, Delaware, U.S.
- Batted: Right Threw: Right

Professional debut
- MLB: April 9, 2002, for the Texas Rangers
- NPB: April 3, 2009, for the Hanshin Tigers

Last appearance
- NPB: May 16, 2009, for the Hanshin Tigers
- MLB: October 3, 2010, for the Washington Nationals

MLB statistics
- Batting average: .268
- Home runs: 89
- Runs batted in: 331

NPB statistics
- Batting average: .148
- Runs batted in: 2
- Stats at Baseball Reference

Teams
- Texas Rangers (2002–2006); Milwaukee Brewers (2006–2007); Toronto Blue Jays (2008); Hanshin Tigers (2009); Washington Nationals (2010)

Kevin Ford Mench (born January 7, 1978) is an American former professional baseball outfielder who played eight years in Major League Baseball (MLB) with the Texas Rangers (2002–2006), Milwaukee Brewers (2006–2007), Toronto Blue Jays (2008) and Washington Nationals (2010). He also spent a season in Nippon Professional Baseball (NPB) with the Hanshin Tigers in 2009. He is most noted for having had the largest cap size (8 1/4) in the majors when he was an active player, a feature that earned him the nickname Shrek.

== High school and college career ==
Mench attended The Independence School and St. Mark's High School in Delaware. Following high school, Mench attended the University of Delaware where he led the Blue Hens to the NCAA tournament in 1998 and 1999. In 1998, Mench led the NCAA with 33 home runs and knocked in 72 runs to earn Collegiate Baseball National Player of the Year and consensus All-America Honors. In the America East, he was named Rookie of the Year in 1997 and Player of the Year in 1998 and 1999. In 1998, he played collegiate summer baseball for the Chatham A's of the Cape Cod Baseball League. On June 2, 1999, the Texas Rangers drafted Mench in the fourth round with the 118th overall pick. For his accomplishments, Mench was inducted into the University of Delaware athletics hall of fame in 2005.

== Professional career ==
In his rookie year, 2002, Mench hit 15 home runs, tied for third among rookies, and drove in 60 runs. He finished seventh in the American League Rookie of the Year balloting. After an injury-plagued 2003, Mench responded in 2004 by setting career bests in batting average (.279), home runs (26), RBI (71) and slugging percentage (.539). He followed that up by posting similar numbers in 2005, finishing with a .264 average, 25 home runs and a career-high 73 RBI in 150 games.

On June 30, 2005, Mench hit three home runs in a single game against the Los Angeles Angels of Anaheim.

On April 26, 2006, Mench became the 19th player in major league history to hit a home run in at least six straight games. The streak started, oddly, not too long after Mench discovered that a recurring toe injury was due to a shoe problem – he had been wearing size 12 shoes since his teenage years, but discovered his actual shoe size was 12½. On the same date, Mench set an American League record with seven consecutive multi-RBI games, a record which still stands as of 2020.

On April 28, Mench extended his home run streak to seven straight games, shattering his own franchise record with the Texas Rangers, and setting an all-time record for right-handed batters. The current record for most consecutive games with a home run is eight, held by Dale Long, Don Mattingly, and Ken Griffey Jr.

On July 26, 2006, Mench hit a two-run double against the New York Yankees, the 50,000th hit in Rangers franchise history; two days later, he was traded to the Milwaukee Brewers along with Francisco Cordero, Laynce Nix, and Julian Cordero, for Carlos Lee and Nelson Cruz. Mench got his first hit with the Brewers on July 29, 2006, against the Cincinnati Reds, where he also collected an RBI.

During the subsequent offseason, Mench had been repeatedly criticized by Brewers fans on radio programs for his lackluster 2006 performance with the Brewers. Mench hit only .230 with a home run and 18 RBI in 40 games for the Brewers. Mench also stated he did not want to platoon in left field, taken by many fans as an excessive demand considering his performance for the Brewers so far.

On January 16, 2007, Mench and the Brewers agreed on a one-year contract for the 2007 season that would pay him $3.4 million. He was not offered a new contract by the Brewers and became a free agent on December 12, 2007. On February 12, 2008, Mench signed a minor league deal to return to the Rangers.

On May 9, 2008, Mench was traded to the Toronto Blue Jays for cash considerations. On August 25, 2008, Mench was optioned to Triple-A Syracuse by the Blue Jays, but was recalled in early September.

On December 24, 2008, Mench signed a one-year deal to with the Hanshin Tigers of Japan's Nippon Professional Baseball.

On February 2, 2010, Mench signed a minor league deal with the Washington Nationals.

On February 18, 2012, Mench confirmed on his Twitter account his retirement from Major League Baseball.

== Honors ==
In 1998, Mench led the NCAA with 33 home runs and knocked in 72 runs to earn Collegiate Baseball National Player of the Year and consensus All-America Honors. In the America East, he was named Rookie of the Year in 1997 and Player of the Year in 1998 and 1999.

Mench was inducted into the University of Delaware athletics hall of fame in 2005.

He was inducted into the Delaware Sports Hall of Fame in 2017.

== Personal life ==
Mench has three children, twins (boy and girl) and a younger girl. He spends most of his time with his family and his best friends Mark and Jana Barrett.
