= Bill Livesey =

American baseball manager and executive

- Manager/Scout/Executive
- Stats at Baseball Reference

Teams
- As coach: Worcester Academy (1963–1966); University of Maine (1967–1968); Brown University (1969–1971); Eckerd College (1972–1977); Paintsville Yankees (1979); Oneonta Yankees (1983–1984); As executive: New York Yankees (1980–1982, 1991–1996); Tampa Bay Devil Rays (1998–2001); Toronto Blue Jays (2003); New York Mets (2004–2005); New York Yankees (2008–2009); Pittsburgh Pirates (2012–present)

William Livesey is an American professional baseball manager, scout, and front-office executive. He is a special adviser to the general manager of the Pittsburgh Pirates.

== Career ==
A native of Brewster, Massachusetts, Livesey was a baseball, basketball, and soccer player at Orleans High School, where he graduated in 1958. He attended the University of Maine and played college baseball for the Maine Black Bears, graduating in 1962. While being a student at Maine, Livesey played several summers with the Dennis Clippers of the Cape Cod Baseball League (CCBL).

After college, Livesey taught and coached at Worcester Academy for four years, then took an assistant coaching job at his alma mater, Maine, under head coach Jack Butterfield, where he remained for two seasons. Livesey was head coach at Brown University from 1969 to 1971, Eckerd College from 1972 to 1977, and managed the Paintsville Yankees in 1979.

During the summers of 1965 to 1972, Livesey also managed the CCBL's Falmouth Commodores. In his eight seasons with Falmouth, Livesey won five league championships, including four consecutive from 1968–1971. At Falmouth, he managed several future major leaguers, including Bill Almon, Mike Flanagan, and Paul Mitchell. Livesey returned to the CCBL to manage the Wareham Gatemen in 1976 and 1977, winning another CCBL title in 1976 with a team featuring future big-leaguer Joe Lefebvre. In 2002, Livesey was inducted into the CCBL Hall of Fame.

Livesey was the Yankees' director of player development from 1980 to 1982. He then managed the Oneonta Yankees in 1983–1984. He served as the Yankees' scouting director from 1991 to 1996, where he was instrumental in assembling the "Core Four" that led New York to multiple World Series championships.

Livesey moved to the Tampa Bay Devil Rays as director of player development in 1998 and special assistant to the GM from 1999 to 2001. He held the latter position with the Toronto Blue Jays in 2003 and the New York Mets from 2004 to 2005. Livesey returned to the Yankees organization as a scout. After the 2012 season, the Pittsburgh Pirates hired Livesey as a special adviser to general manager Neal Huntington.

Livesey was inducted into the University of Maine Sports Hall of Fame in 2018, and the Eckerd College Athletics Hall of Fame in 2019.

== Personal life ==
Livesey has two sons; Jeff, a major league coach, and Steve, who has been with the Tampa Bay Rays since their inception currently serving as the Hitting Coordinator.
