= Michael Driscoll (baseball) =

American baseball player (1892-1953)

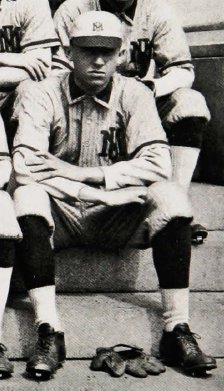
- Driscoll with the University of Maine in 1914
- Pitcher
- Born: October 19, 1892; North Abington, Massachusetts, U.S.
- Died: March 22, 1953 (aged 60); Foxboro, Massachusetts, U.S.
- Batted: Right Threw: Right

MLB debut
- July 6, 1916, for the Philadelphia Athletics

Last MLB appearance
- July 6, 1916, for the Philadelphia Athletics

MLB statistics
- Win–loss record: 0–1
- Earned run average: 5.40
- Strikeouts: 0
- Stats at Baseball Reference

Teams
- Philadelphia Athletics (1916)

Michael Columbus Driscoll (October 19, 1892 – March 22, 1953) was an American professional baseball pitcher with the Philadelphia Athletics during the 1916 season. He was born in North Abington, Massachusetts and attended the University of Maine, where he played college baseball for the Black Bears in the 1910s. He died in 1953 and was buried in Easton, Massachusetts.
