= Pat French =

American baseball player (1893-1969)

- Outfielder
- Born: September 22, 1893; Dover, New Hampshire, U.S.
- Died: July 13, 1969 (aged 75); Bath, Maine, U.S.
- Batted: Right Threw: Right

MLB debut
- July 2, 1917, for the Philadelphia Athletics

Last MLB appearance
- July 4, 1917, for the Philadelphia Athletics

MLB statistics
- Batting Average: .000
- Home Runs: 0
- RBI: 0
- Stats at Baseball Reference

Teams
- Philadelphia Athletics (1917)

Frank Alexander French (September 22, 1893 – July 13, 1969) was an American professional baseball outfielder with the Philadelphia Athletics during the 1917 season. He was born in Dover, New Hampshire and is buried in Dover, New Hampshire.

He attended the University of Maine, where he played college baseball for the Black Bears in the 1910s.
