= Mike Lude =

American college football and baseball coach (1922–2024)

Biographical details
- Born: June 30, 1922; Kalamazoo, Michigan, U.S.
- Died: March 14, 2024 (aged 101); Tucson, Arizona, U.S.

Playing career

Football
- 1946: Hillsdale

Baseball
- 1945–1947: Hillsdale
- Position: Catcher (baseball)

Coaching career (HC unless noted)

Football
- 1948: Hillsdale (line)
- 1949–1950: Maine (assistant)
- 1951–1961: Delaware (line)
- 1962–1969: Colorado State

Baseball
- 1948–1949: Hillsdale
- 1950–1951: Maine

Administrative career (AD unless noted)
- 1970–1976: Kent State
- 1976–1991: Washington
- 1992–1994: Auburn

Head coaching record
- Overall: 29–51–1 (football); 43–26 (baseball)

Accomplishments and honors

Championships
- Baseball; 2 MIAA (1948–1949)

Milo Ralph Lude (June 30, 1922 – March 14, 2024) was an American college football and college baseball coach and athletics administrator. He played football and baseball at Hillsdale College, where he was a member of the Alpha Tau Omega fraternity. He served as the head coach at Colorado State University from 1962 to 1969, compiling a record of 29–51–1. Lude was the head baseball coach at Hillsdale College from 1948 to 1949 and at the University of Maine from 1950 to 1951. He served as the athletic director at Kent State University (1970–1976), the University of Washington (1976–1991), and Auburn University (1992–1994).

As athletic director at Kent State, Lude offered Don James his first head coaching job in 1971; the two later worked together for fifteen years at Washington.

Lude went skydiving for the first time at the age of 93. In 2021, Lude stated that he planned to do the same for his 100th birthday. He died in Tucson, Arizona, on March 14, 2024, at the age of 101.

== Head coaching record ==
=== Football ===
Year	Team	Overall	Conference	Standing
Colorado State Rams (NCAA University Division independent) (1962–1967)
1962	Colorado State	0–10		
1963	Colorado State	3–7		
1964	Colorado State	5–6		
1965	Colorado State	4–6		
1966	Colorado State	7–3		
1967	Colorado State	4–5–1		
Colorado State Rams (Western Athletic Conference) (1968–1969)
1968	Colorado State	2–8	1–4 (Note: Colorado State's 1968 games against Texas Tech and Air Force counted in the conference standings even though neither of those teams was a member of the Western Athletic Conference (WAC).)	6th
1969	Colorado State	4–6	0–4	8th
Colorado State:		29–51–1	1–8	
Total:		29–51–1		

=== Baseball ===
Record table
Season	Team	Overall	Conference	Standing	Postseason
Hillsdale Dales (Michigan Intercollegiate Athletic Association) (1948–1949)
1948	Hillsdale	14–3			
1949	Hillsdale	17–4	9–0	1st	
Hillsdal:		31–7 (.816)			
Maine Black Bears (Yankee Conference) (1950–1951)
1950	Maine	12–9			
1951	Maine	10–10			
Maine:		22–19 (.537)			
Total:		43–26 (.623)			
National champion Postseason invitational champion Conference regular season champion Conference regular season and conference tournament champion Division regular season champion Division regular season and conference tournament champion Conference tournament champion
