= Jeff Plympton =

American baseball player (born 1965)

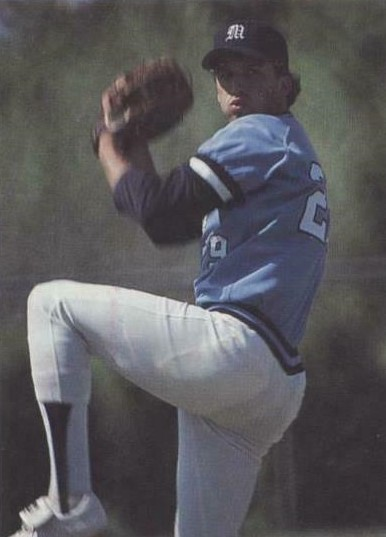
- Pitcher
- Born: November 24, 1965 (age 59); Framingham, Massachusetts, U.S.
- Batted: Right Threw: Right

MLB debut
- June 15, 1991, for the Boston Red Sox

Last MLB appearance
- September 16, 1991, for the Boston Red Sox

MLB statistics
- Win–loss record: 0–0
- Earned run average: 0.00
- Strikeouts: 2

Teams
- Boston Red Sox (1991)

Jeffrey Hunter Plympton (born November 24, 1965) is an American former relief pitcher in Major League Baseball who played briefly for the Boston Red Sox during the 1991 season. Listed at 6' 2", 205 lb., Plympton batted and threw right-handed. He was selected by the Boston Red Sox in the 10th round of 1987 draft out of the University of Maine, where he played college baseball for the Black Bears from 1985 to 1987.

In 1985, he played collegiate summer baseball with the Wareham Gatemen of the Cape Cod Baseball League. Plympton posted a 2–1 record with a 1.06 ERA for Maine in the 1986 College World Series. Overall that summer, he finished 7–2 with a 3.10 ERA, tying Mike Remlinger (Dartmouth) for the most wins.

In four relief appearances for Boston, Plympton recorded a perfect 0.00 ERA without a save, giving up five hits and four walks while striking out two in 5 1/3 innings of work.

Plympton also played in the Red Sox minor league system from 1987 to 1993. He went 27–29 with a 3.23 ERA and 43 saves in 279 games, including 223 walks, 457 strikeouts, and 502.0 innings pitched.

== See also ==
- 1991 Boston Red Sox season
- Boston Red Sox all-time roster
