= Dick Whitmore =

American basketball coach

Biographical details
- Born: January 10, 1943 (age 83); Portland, Maine, U.S.

Playing career
- 1962–1965: Bowdoin
- Position: Center

Coaching career (HC unless noted)
- 1965–1968: Hall-Dale HS (ME) (freshman/JV)
- 1968–1970: Morse HS (ME)
- 1970–2011: Colby
- 2014: Thomas (ME)

Administrative career (AD unless noted)
- 1987–2002: Colby

Head coaching record
- Overall: 648–356

Richard L. Whitmore Jr. (January 10, 1943) is an American former basketball coach and college athletics administrator. He served as the head men's basketball coach at Colby College from 1970 to 2011 and Thomas College in 2014. He was also Colby's athletic director from 1987 to 2002.

== Playing ==
Whitmore was born in Portland, Maine, where his father, Dick Sr., was the basketball coach at Cheverus High School. Whitmore played for his father at Archbishop Williams High School in Braintree, Massachusetts and averaged 20 points per game as a senior. He attended Bowdoin College, where he led the team in scoring and rebounding in all three of his varsity seasons. In 1963, he helped lead the Polar Bears to their first Maine Intercollegiate Athletic Association title. He finished his career with the most rebounds (622) and second most points (1,028) in school history. He graduated from Bowdoin 1965 with a degree in Latin.

== Coaching ==
Whitmore began his coaching career as the freshman and junior varsity basketball coach at Hall-Dale High School in Farmingdale, Maine. He then spent two seasons as the head boys' basketball coach at Morse High School in Bath, Maine. In 1969, he led Morse to the Western Maine finals.

From 1970 to 2011, Whitmore was the head coach at Colby College. He compiled a 637–341 record, which was seventh all-time among NCAA Division III men's basketball coaches. Under his leadership, Colby won the 1972 Maine Intercollegiate Athletic Association title and three ECAC men's basketball tournament championships (1990, 1991, and 1997). The Mules made the NCAA Division III men's basketball tournament twice during Whitemore's tenure. He coached fourteen All-Americans and a number of his players, including David Arseneault and David McLaughlin, went on to become college coaches. He was named Maine coach of the year six times. From 1987 to 2002, he was also Colby's athletic director.

Since retiring from Colby, Whitmore has worked with his son-in-law at Pine Tree Seafood and Produce Co. in Scarborough, Maine and was an adjunct professor at Thomas College. In 2012, he was named president of the Maine Sports Hall of Fame. In 2014, he became Thomas's interim men's basketball coach after the sudden resignation of Darrell "Texas" Alexander.

== Honors ==
In 1998, Whitmore was inducted into the inaugural class of the Maine Sports Hall of Fame. In 2012, he was inducted into the Bowdoin Athletic Hall of Honor. In 2019, Colby College endowed the Richard L. Whitmore Jr. Head Coach for Colby Men's Basketball in Whitmore's honor.
