= Maine Black Bears baseball =

Varsity intercollegiate baseball program of the University of Maine

- 2026 Maine Black Bears baseball team
- Founded: 1881
- University: University of Maine
- Head coach: Nick Derba (10th season)
- Conference: America East
- Location: Orono, Maine
- Home stadium: Mahaney Diamond (capacity: 4,400)
- Nickname: Black Bears
- Colors: Maine blue, white, and navy

College World Series appearances
- 1964, 1976, 1981, 1982, 1983, 1984, 1986

NCAA regional champions
- 1976, 1981, 1982, 1983, 1984, 1986

NCAA tournament appearances
- 1964, 1975, 1976, 1980, 1981, 1982, 1983, 1984, 1986, 1990, 1991, 1993, 2002, 2005, 2006, 2011, 2023

Conference tournament champions
- ECAC: 1976, 1980, 1981, 1982, 1983, 1984, 1986, 1991; NAC/America East: 1993, 2002, 2005, 2006, 2011, 2023

Conference regular season champions
- NAC/America East: 1990, 1991, 1993, 2002, 2013, 2022, 2023

The Maine Black Bears baseball team is the varsity intercollegiate baseball program of the University of Maine, located in Orono, Maine. It is the university's oldest athletic program, having begun play in 1881. It has been a member of the NCAA Division I America East Conference since its founding (as the North Atlantic Conference) at the start of the 1990 season. Its home venue is Mahaney Diamond, located on the university's campus. Nick Derba is the head coach. He was named interim head coach prior to the 2017 season. The program has appeared in 16 NCAA tournaments and seven College World Series. In conference postseason play, it has won eight ECAC Tournaments and five America East tournaments. In conference regular season play, it has won five America East titles (three of those when the league was known as the North Atlantic Conference). 19 former Black Bears have appeared in Major League Baseball.

== History ==
=== Early history ===
The University of Maine opened in fall 1868 as the Maine College of Agriculture and the Mechanic Arts. The baseball program, founded in 1881, was the school's first intercollegiate athletic program. It went 3–3 in its first season. The program continued to play a handful of games each season during the 1880s; during this time, Irv Ray, Maine's first alumnus to play in Major League Baseball, played for the program. It played its first 10-game schedule in 1886 and won 10 games for the first time in 1888. The university did not sponsor a baseball team in 1892, but the team resumed in 1893.

From the program's inception through the 1893 season, student coaches coached the team. For the 1894 season, the school hired Harry Miller as its first faculty head coach. In two seasons under Miller (1894 and 1895), the team went 5–7 and 8–4, respectively. Jack Abbott, the program's second head coach, led the team to a 5–4 record in 1896. Under W. W. Bustard, Maine had consecutive 9–4 seasons in 1897 and 1898. The university changed its name from the Maine College of Agriculture and the Mechanic Arts to its current name following the 1897 season.

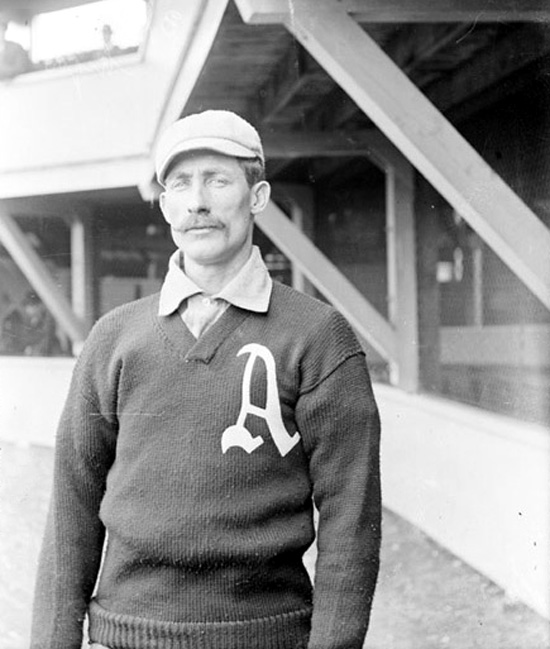
Monte Cross while playing for the Philadelphia Athletics.

Through the end of the 1923 season, Maine competed as an independent school. During this time, its highest single-season win total was 11, a mark reached three times (twice under head coach William Magill). Eight future major leaguers played for the program: Clarence Blethen, Harvey Cushman, Michael Driscoll, Pat French, Otis Lawry, Marty McHale, Ralph Pond, and Harland Rowe. In 1902, the team played an exhibition game against the New York Giants at the Polo Grounds.

The longest-tenured head coach of the period was former Philadelphia Athletics player Monte Cross, who coached the team for six seasons (1916–1921) and had an overall record of 33–33–3. An April 1916 Lewiston Daily Sun article said of Cross, "His easy-going, but nevertheless strict instructions and discipline, together with the knowledge of the inside features of the National game, and the manner in which he teaches them, make an everlasting impression on the students, players, and managers." In 1919, Cross became the first Maine baseball coach to receive the "M" award from the university's president.

After Joseph Murphy coached the program from 1924 to 1925, a total of two coaches led the team until 1949. Murphy assistant Fred Brice was the program's head coach for 10 seasons (1926–1935), and William Kenyon held the position for 13 seasons (1936–1943, 1945–1949). Under Brice, Maine had a 67–60 record; its best single-season record during his tenure was 9–5 in 1932. For the previous season, 1931, the baseball team had moved to a location behind Memorial Gym after previously playing at Alumni Field. In the mid-1930s, 1936 Olympian Clarence Keegan played for Brice. Under Kenyon, Maine went 61–91–1. It went 11–7 in 1938 to tie the program record for wins and won Maine State Series championships in 1937 and 1942.

From 1937 to 1943, Maine played in the New England Conference, along with Connecticut, Rhode Island State, New Hampshire, and Northeastern. Maine won the conference championship in 1938, but in the conference's seven seasons of baseball competition, it had the worst overall record among the five teams.

=== Yankee Conference ===
From 1949 to 1979, Maine played in the Yankee Conference. For the majority of its time in the conference, its fellow members were Connecticut, Massachusetts, New Hampshire, Rhode Island, and Vermont. In 31 seasons in the league, Maine had the third-highest winning percentage (.548), behind Connecticut and Massachusetts.

Maine won its first Yankee championship in 1950 under head coach Mike Lude but did not win another in that decade. It began to have more success after Jack Butterfield was named head coach for the start of the 1957 season. Butterfield had played at Maine in the early 1950s and served as an assistant in 1956. In his fourth season, 1960, Maine shared the Yankee title with Connecticut after both went 8–2 in conference. Baseball executive Bill Livesey featured on the 1960 championship team.

In 1964, the Black Bears went 21–8, won the Yankee Conference, and reached their first College World Series (CWS). Maine swept Northeastern in the best-of-three District 1 Regional to reach Omaha. Maine began the tournament 1–1, beating Seton Hall in the opener but losing to Minnesota in the 1–0 game. In the losers bracket, Maine defeated Arizona State (also playing in its first CWS) and defending champion USC. In the semi-finals, Maine was eliminated by a 2–1 loss to Missouri. Pitcher Joe Ferris was named the Most Outstanding Player.

Butterfield led the team through the end of the 1974 season, when he left to coach South Florida, in part because of disagreements with Maine's administration about the program's funding. In his final decade, Maine shared two more Yankee titles and had another 20-win season, but it did not return to the NCAA tournament. Butterfield finished with an overall Maine record of 240–169–2.

Maine hired Colby head coach John Winkin as Butterfield's replacement. Winkin went on to lead the team for 22 seasons (1975–1996) and was Maine's most successful head coach. He had an overall record of 642–430–3 and led Maine to 10 NCAA tournaments and 6 College World Series. His teams included nine future Major League Baseball players: Mike Bordick, Kevin Buckley, Fred Howard, Joe Johnson, Jeff Plympton, Bert Roberge, Mark Sweeney, Bill Swift, and Larry Thomas.

After making an NCAA Regional in Winkin's first season, Maine reached the 1976 College World Series. There, it went 2–2. After losing its opener, 3–2, to Eastern Michigan, the team knocked out Auburn and Washington State before being eliminated. Maine returned to the CWS in 1981, when it had its first 30-win season. After defeating St. John's in the Northeast Regional finals, the Black Bears went 0–2 in Omaha.

The 1981 appearance was the first of four consecutive trips to Omaha, winning the Northeast Regional (which it often hosted) on several occasions. The Black Bears also reached the CWS in 1986, their first 40-win season. At the CWS, the team went 0–2 in 1983, 1984, and 1986, but finished tied for third in 1982. After losing its opener to Miami, it notched losers bracket wins against Cal State Fullerton, Wichita State, and Stanford before being knocked out by Miami. Bob Whalen, who went on to become the head coach at Dartmouth, was an assistant to Winkin during these four appearances.

=== America East Conference ===
Maine joined the North Atlantic Conference for the 1990 season. In its first four seasons in the conference, it reached three NCAA tournaments (1990, 1991, 1993), losing to Clemson in the regional final in 1991. Maine players won several major conference awards in the early 1990s, including a sweep of the Pitcher and Player of the Year (by Larry Thomas and Mark Sweeney) in 1991.

Winkin's contract was not renewed after the 1996 season, and the school hired Providence head coach Paul Kostacopoulos to replace him. (The North Atlantic was also renamed the America East after the 1996 season.) Kostacopoulos led the team for nine seasons (1997–2005). Maine's best season under him came in 2002, when the Black Bears went 40–17 (16–6 America East), won the conference's regular season and tournament titles, and reached the Los Angeles Regional. The team also reached the 2005 NCAA tournament under Kostacopoulos, who was twice named the America East Coach of the Year.

When Kostacopoulos left for Navy after the 2005 season, Maine hired Manhattan head coach Steve Trimper to replace him. Trimper had previously coached in the America East as an assistant at Vermont in the 1990s. Under him, Maine returned to the NCAA tournament in 2006 and 2011, playing in the Chapel Hill Regional both times and winning a game in 2011. In 2013, Trimper was named America East Coach of the Year, and the Black Bears won three of four major conference awards after winning the regular season title. In the America East Tournament, the team lost to Binghamton in the championship game.

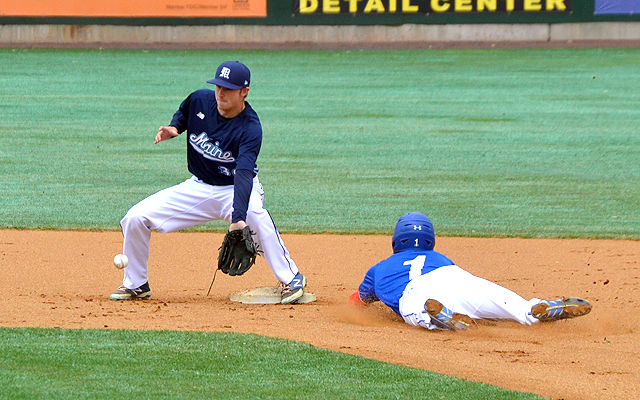
Maine playing against UMass Lowell in 2014

=== Conference membership ===
- Independent (1881–1891, 1893–1936, 1945–1948, 1980–1981)
- New England Conference (1937–1943)
- Yankee Conference (1949–1979)
- Eastern Collegiate Athletic Conference (1982–1989) (Note: Maine competed to qualify for the ECAC Tournament starting in 1976, but the ECAC did not sponsor regular, round-robin conference play until 1982.)
  - North Division (1982–1989)
- America East Conference (1990–present)
  - Known as the North Atlantic Conference from 1990 to 1997

== Maine in the NCAA tournament ==
Maine has appeared in the NCAA Division I baseball tournament fifteen times. They have a record of 36–32.

Year	Region	Opponent	Result
1964	District 1 Champions; College World Series	Northeastern	W 9–5
1964	District 1 Champions; College World Series	Northeastern	W 4–2
1964	District 1 Champions; College World Series	Seton Hall	W 5–1
1964	District 1 Champions; College World Series	Minnesota	L 0–12
1964	District 1 Champions; College World Series	Arizona State	W 4–2
1964	District 1 Champions; College World Series	USC	W 2–1
1964	District 1 Champions; College World Series	Missouri	L 1–2
1975	Northeast Regional	St. John's	L 3–17
1975	Northeast Regional	Penn	W 1–0
1975	Northeast Regional	St. John's	W 6–5
1975	Northeast Regional	Seton Hall	L 5–11
1976	College World Series 4th place, Northeast Regional Champions	Penn State	W 11–4
1976	College World Series 4th place, Northeast Regional Champions	Temple	W 6–3
1976	College World Series 4th place, Northeast Regional Champions	Seton Hall	W 3–1
1976	College World Series 4th place, Northeast Regional Champions	Seton Hall	W 4–2
1976	College World Series 4th place, Northeast Regional Champions	Eastern Michigan	L 2–3
1976	College World Series 4th place, Northeast Regional Champions	Auburn	W 9–8
1976	College World Series 4th place, Northeast Regional Champions	Washington State	W 6–3
1976	College World Series 4th place, Northeast Regional Champions	Arizona State	L 0–7
1980	Northeast Regional	St. John's; East Carolina; Harvard	L 4–6; W 2–1; L 5–7
1981	College World Series 7th place, Northeast Regional Champions	Central Michigan; St. John's; St. John's; St. John's; Miami; South Carolina	W 10–2; W 10–5; L 5–10; W 15–0; L 1–6; L 7–12
1982	College World Series 3rd place, Northeast Regional Champions	Seton Hall; Delaware; Navy; Miami; Cal State Fullerton; Stanford; Miami	W 6–4; W 13–1; W 4–3; L 2–7; W 6–0; W 8–5; L 4–10
1983	College World Series 7th place, Northeast Regional Champions	NYIT; Harvard; Harvard; Michigan; Arizona State	W 8–2; W 6–2; W 4–3; L 5–6; L 0–7
1984	College World Series 7th place, Northeast Regional Champions	Rider; Harvard; Seton Hall; Oklahoma State; Miami	W 12–6; W 5–4; L 2–3; W 5–2; L 5–9; L 7–13
1986	College World Series 7th place, Northeast Regional Champions	Rutgers; St. John's; St. John's; Arizona; LSU	W 5–1; W 13–7; W 21–8; L 7–8; L 4–8
1990	Northeast Regional	Iowa; Georgia; Rutgers	W 4–3; L 3–6; L 4–5
1991	Northeast Regional	Villanova; Mississippi State; Towson; Mississippi State; Clemson	W 10–3; L 5–6; W 8–0; W 8–5; L 5–13
1993	Central II Regional	Cal State Fullerton	L 5–11
1993	Central II Regional	McNeese State	L 3–16
2002	Los Angeles Regional	Cal State Northridge	L 4–7
2002	Los Angeles Regional	BYU	L 5–12
2005	Oxford Regional	Ole Miss	L 0–5
2005	Oxford Regional	Southern Miss	W 12–2
2005	Oxford Regional	Oklahoma	10–11
2023	Coral Gables Regional	Miami	L 1–9
2023	Coral Gables Regional	Louisiana	L 10–19

== Venues ==
=== Early venues ===
The program played at several locations on Maine's campus in its early seasons. During the 1910s and 1920s, it played at Alumni Field. In 1931, it moved to "a section directly behind Memorial gym."

=== Mahaney Diamond ===
The program currently plays at Mahaney Diamond, which opened in the early 1980s and is located on the northern end of the university's campus. It has a capacity of 4,400 spectators and is named for Maine alumnus and donor Larry Mahaney, who graduated from the university in 1951. The field has a FieldTurf surface, and the facility has been renovated many times since the mid 1980s.

The facility hosted NCAA Regionals in 1982, 1983, 1984, 1986, and 1991. It has also hosted four AEC tournaments (1996, 2002, 2004 and 2018).

== Coaches ==
=== Head coaches ===
Since Harry Miller became the program's first record head coach for the 1894 season, Maine has had 24 head coaches. John Winkin, who was Maine's head coach from 1975 to 1996, is both the program's longest tenured and winningest head coach. He coached for 22 seasons and won 642 games.

Tenure	Coach	Seasons	Record	Pct.
1881–1891, 1893	Unknown	12	45–37–1	.549
1894–1895	Harry Miller	2	13–11	.542
1896	Jack Abbott	1	5–4	.556
1897–1898	W. W. Bustard	2	18–8	.692
1899–1901	William Magill	3	24–13	.649
1902–1905	Frank Rudderham	4	33–27	.550
1906	E. G. Butman	1	3–12	.200
1907–1908	W. J. Fitzmaurice	2	7–18	.280
1909	P. J. Noonan	1	7–5	.583
1910	Pat Keefe	1	8–4	.667
1911	Edgar Wingard	1	3–8	.272
1912–1913	George Magoon	2	12–13–1	.480
1914–1915	John Phelan	2	12–15	.444
1916–1921	Monte Cross	6	33–33–3	.500
1922–1923	Wilkie Clark	2	14–15	.483
1924–1925	Joseph Murphy	2	10–14–1	.417
1926–1935	Fred Brice	10	67–60	.528
1936–1943, 1945–1949	William C. Kenyon	13	67–111–2	.376
1950–1951	Mike Lude	2	22–19	.537
1952–1954	Tubby Raymond	2	36–26–1	.581
1954–1956	Walter Anderson	3	19–21–1	.475
1957–1974	Jack Butterfield	18	240–169–2	.588
1975–1996	John Winkin	22	642–430–3	.599
1997–2005	Paul Kostacopoulos	9	284–195	.593
2006–2016	Steve Trimper	11	309–292–2	.514
2017–present	Nick Derba	8	154–211	.422
Totals	25	142	2,087–1,771–18	.541

== Yearly records ==
The program's first season came in 1881. Since then, the school has sponsored a team in each season except 1892 and 1944. Below is a table of the program's yearly records since its inception.

Record table
Season	Coach	Overall	Conference	Standing	Postseason
Independent (1881–1891)
1881		3–3			
1882		1–1			
1883		3–3			
1884		3–0			
1885		4–2			
1886		4–6			
1887		4–6–1			
1888		10–2			
1889		6–4			
1890		2–4			
1891		4–3			
No team (1892)
Independent (1893–1936)
1893		1–3			
1894	Harry Miller	5–7			
1895	Harry Miller	8–4			
1896	Jack Abbott	5–4			
1897	W. W. Bustard	9–4			
1898	W. W. Bustard	9–4			
1899	William Magill	11–2			
1900	William Magill	6–7			
1901	William Magill	6–7			
1902	Frank Rudderham	11–8			
1903	Frank Rudderham	11–4			
1904	Frank Rudderham	4–6			
1905	Frank Rudderham	7–9			
1906	E. G. Butman	3–12			
1907	W. J. Fitzmaurice	1–12			
1908	W. J. Fitzmaurice	1–12			
1909	P. J. Noonan	7–5			
1910	Pat Keefe	8–4			
1911	Edgar Wingard	3–8			
1912	George Magoon	7–6–1			
1913	George Magoon	5–7			
1914	John Phelan	5–6			
1915	John Phelan	7–9			
1916	Monte Cross	8–4–2			
1917	Monte Cross	2–4			
1918	Monte Cross	3–5			
1919	Monte Cross	8–5			
1920	Monte Cross	7–5			
1921	Monte Cross	5–10–1			
1922	Wilkie Clark	8–7			
1923	Wilkie Clark	6–8			
1924	Joseph Murphy	5–8			
1925	Joseph Murphy	5–6–1			
1926	Fred Brice	6–5			
1927	Fred Brice	7–4			
1928	Fred Brice	3–9			
1929	Fred Brice	8–6			
1930	Fred Brice	8–7			
1931	Fred Brice	7–6			
1932	Fred Brice	9–5			
1933	Fred Brice	5–7			
1934	Fred Brice	5–7			
1935	Fred Brice	7–6			
1936	William Kenyon	6–6			
Independent:		312–314–8			
New England Conference (1937–1943)
1937	William Kenyon	9–5–1	3–3	2nd	
1938	William Kenyon	11–7	6–2	1st	
1939	William Kenyon	4–13	0–8	5th	
1940	William Kenyon	5–11	1–6	5th	
1941	William Kenyon	4–12	1–6	5th	
1942	William Kenyon	6–8	3–5	t-3rd	
1943	William Kenyon	4–8	3–5	4th	
New England:		43–64–1	17–35		
No team (1944)
Independent (1945–1948)
1945	William Kenyon	2–7			
1946	William Kenyon	3–8			
1947	William Kenyon	7–6			
1948	William Kenyon	2–9–1			
Independent:		12–30–1			
Yankee Conference (1949–1979)
1949	William Kenyon	4–11	1–4	5th	
1950	Mike Lude	12–9	4–1	1st	
1951	Mike Lude	10–10	2–4	t-5th	
1952	Tubby Raymond	11–10–1	3–2	3rd	
1953	Tubby Raymond	11–7	2–2	t-3rd	
1954	Tubby Raymond	14–9	3–3	3rd	
1955	Walter Anderson	12–10	2–5	6th	
1956	Walter Anderson	7–11–1	0–7	6th	
1957	Jack Butterfield	6–14	3–5	t-4th	
1958	Jack Butterfield	12–9	5–3	3rd	
1959	Jack Butterfield	12–8	7–3	2nd	
1960	Jack Butterfield	12–8	8–2	t-1st	
1961	Jack Butterfield	9–13–1	2–6–1	5th	
1962	Jack Butterfield	9–14	5–5	3rd	
1963	Jack Butterfield	9–12	4–5	4th	
1964	Jack Butterfield	21–8	8–2	1st	College World Series
1965	Jack Butterfield	14–7	6–4	t-3rd	
1966	Jack Butterfield	15–9–1	7–3	t-1st	
1967	Jack Butterfield	15–7	5–5	t-3rd	
1968	Jack Butterfield	10–9	3–7	t-4th	
1969	Jack Butterfield	12–12	6–4	t-2nd	
1970	Jack Butterfield	18–6	8–2	t-1st	
1971	Jack Butterfield	16–12	6–9	3rd	
1972	Jack Butterfield	20–7	8–4	t-2nd	
1973	Jack Butterfield	15–9	4–4	3rd	
1974	Jack Butterfield	15–5	4–3	t-3rd	
1975	John Winkin	25–8–1	5–2–1	1st	NCAA Regional
1976	John Winkin	29–9	6–2	2nd	College World Series
1977	John Winkin	24–11	5–3	t-2nd	ECAC Tournament
1978	John Winkin	20–9	4–4	2nd	
1979	John Winkin	23–9	7–3	t-1st	ECAC Tournament
Yankee:		442–292–5	143–118–2		
Independent (Note: Although Maine's in-New England games counted towards qualification for the ECAC Tournament from 1980 to 1981, the league did not sponsor regular, round-robin conference play until 1982.) (1980–1981)
1980	John Winkin	23–13–1			NCAA Regional
1981	John Winkin	32–14			College World Series
Independent:		55–27–1			
Eastern Collegiate Athletic Conference (Note: Maine began competing to qualify for the ECAC Tournament in 1976, but the body did not adopt regular, round-robin scheduling until 1982. Since the ECAC did not award a regular season champion, Maine continued to compete in the Yankee Conference until it folded after the 1979 season.) (1982–1989)
1982	John Winkin	35–13	10–3	1st (New England)	College World Series
1983	John Winkin	29–16	11–1	1st (New England)	College World Series
1984	John Winkin	33–20	15–3	1st (New England)	College World Series
1985	John Winkin	38–17	11–0	1st (New England)	ECAC Tournament
1986	John Winkin	41–23	13–1	1st (New England)	College World Series
1987	John Winkin	24–23	8–6	3rd (New England)	
1988	John Winkin	33–24	10–2	1st (New England)	ECAC Tournament
1989	John Winkin	32–26	14–1	1st (New England)	ECAC Tournament
ECAC:		265–162	92–17		
North Atlantic/America East (1990–present)
1990	John Winkin	42–20	12–3	1st	NCAA Regional
1991	John Winkin	48–18	14–1	1st	NCAA Regional
1992	John Winkin	19–24–1	11–11	5th	
1993	John Winkin	33–27	22–4	1st	NCAA Regional
1994	John Winkin	20–33	13–12	4th	NAC tournament (Note: In this season, all members of the North Atlantic Conference qualified for its postseason tournament.)
1995	John Winkin	20–37	11–13	6th	NAC tournament
1996	John Winkin	19–36	12–8	t-2nd	NAC tournament
1997	Paul Kostacopoulos	24–27	16–8	2nd	America East tournament
1998	Paul Kostacopoulos	24–26	12–16	5th	
1999	Paul Kostacopoulos	28–28	14–14	t-4th	America East tournament
2000	Paul Kostacopoulos	25–24	14–12	5th	
2001	Paul Kostacopoulos	36–15	20–8	2nd	America East tournament
2002	Paul Kostacopoulos	40–17	16–6	1st	NCAA Regional
2003	Paul Kostacopoulos	38–18	17–7	2nd	America East tournament
2004	Paul Kostacopoulos	34–21	14–7	t-2nd	America East tournament
2005	Paul Kostacopoulos	35–19	14–7	t-2nd	NCAA Regional
2006	Steve Trimper	35–22–1	13–9	3rd	NCAA Regional
2007	Steve Trimper	22–31	12–11	4th	America East tournament
2008	Steve Trimper	20–28–1	8–15	7th	
2009	Steve Trimper	32–23	13–11	5th	
2010	Steve Trimper	34–22	17–7	2nd	America East tournament
2011	Steve Trimper	33–24	18–6	2nd	NCAA Regional
2012	Steve Trimper	28–28	11–11	4th	America East tournament
2013	Steve Trimper	37–22	20–9	1st	America East tournament
2014	Steve Trimper	24–29	10–11	5th	America East tournament
2015	Steve Trimper	24–28	10–10	T-3rd	America East tournament
2016	Steve Trimper	20–35	8–15	6th	America East tournament
2017	Nick Derba	25–29	8–12	5th	America East tournament
2018	Nick Derba	20–34	12–12	5th	America East tournament
2019	Nick Derba	15–34	11–12	5th	America East tournament
2020	Nick Derba	1–12	0–0	N/A	Postseason cancelled due to COVID-19
2021	Nick Derba	22–22	16–17	2nd (Division A)	America East tournament
2022	Nick Derba	27–22	21–9	1st (Division A)	America East tournament
2023	Nick Derba	32–21	19–5	1st	NCAA Regional
NAC/America East:		878–815–3	419–305		
Total:		2,017–1,693–16			
National champion Postseason invitational champion Conference regular season champion Conference regular season and conference tournament champion Division regular season champion Division regular season and conference tournament champion Conference tournament champion

== Notable players ==
The following is a list of notable former Black Bears and the seasons in which they played for the program, where available.

- Clarence Blethen (1912–1915)
- Mike Bordick (1984–1986)
- Kevin Buckley (1979–1981)
- Brian Butterfield (1976)
- Jack Butterfield (1951–1953)
- John Cumberland (1966)
- Harvey Cushman (1897)
- Michael Driscoll (1911–1916)
- Joe Ferris (1963–1966)
- Pat French (1912–1917)
- Fred Howard (1975)
- Joe Johnson (1980–1982)
- Otis Lawry (1914–1916)
- Jack Leggett (1973–1976)
- Bill Livesey (1959–1962)
- Marty McHale (1908–1910)
- Stump Merrill (1963–1966)
- Jeremy Peña (2016–2018)
- Jeff Plympton (1985–1987)
- Ralph Pond (1909–1910)
- Irv Ray (1883–1888)
- Bert Roberge (1973–1976)
- Harland Rowe (1914–1916)
- Curt Smith (2005–2008)
- Dean Smith
- Mark Sweeney (1988–1991)
- Bill Swift (1981–1984)
- Larry Thomas (1989–1991)
- Bob Whalen (1976–1979)

== Major League Baseball draft ==
=== 2011 ===
Two Black Bears were selected in the 2011 Major League Baseball draft: OF Taylor Lewis by the Pittsburgh Pirates (10th round) and P Keith Bilodeau by the San Francisco Giants (24th round). Both players signed professional contracts.

=== 2012 ===
Two Black Bears were selected in the 2012 Major League Baseball draft: P Jeff Gibbs by the Arizona Diamondbacks (9th round) and P Steve Perakslis by the Chicago Cubs (21st round). Gibbs's 9th-round selection was the program's highest since Mike Collar was chosen in the 8th round in 2003. Both Gibbs and Perakslis signed professional contracts.

=== 2013 ===
Two Black Bears were selected in the 2013 Major League Baseball draft, both in the 27th round: SS Michael Fransoso by the Pittsburgh Pirates and P Michael Connolly by the San Francisco Giants. Both players signed professional contracts.

=== 2014 ===
No Black Bears were selected but Tommy Lawrence signed with the Tampa Bay Rays

=== 2018 ===
Two Black Bears were selected in the 2018 Major League Baseball draft: In the 3rd round SS Jeremy Pena by the Houston Astros and in the 5th round C Chris Bec was selected by the Toronto Blue Jays.

== See also ==
- List of NCAA Division I baseball programs
- Maine Black Bears
