= Monte Cross =

American baseball player (1869–1934)

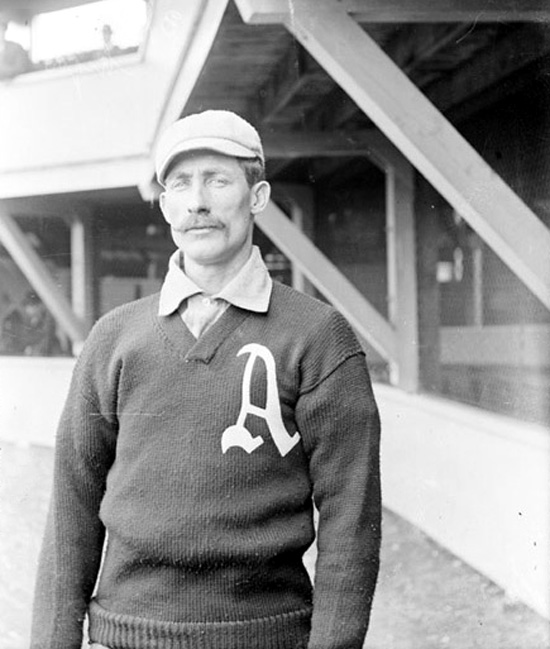
- Shortstop
- Born: August 31, 1869; Philadelphia, Pennsylvania, U.S.
- Died: June 21, 1934 (aged 64); Philadelphia, Pennsylvania, U.S.
- Batted: Right Threw: Right

MLB debut
- September 27, 1892, for the Baltimore Orioles

Last MLB appearance
- October 4, 1907, for the Philadelphia Athletics

MLB statistics
- Batting average: .234
- Home runs: 31
- Runs batted in: 621
- Stats at Baseball Reference

Teams
- Baltimore Orioles (1892–1893); Pittsburgh Pirates (1894–1895); St. Louis Browns (NL) (1896); Philadelphia Phillies (1897–1901); Philadelphia Athletics (1902–1907)

Montford Montgomery Cross (August 31, 1869 – June 21, 1934) was an American Major League Baseball player. He played fifteen seasons in the majors, between 1892 and 1907, for five different teams.

== Baseball career ==
Cross played most of his career in Philadelphia, where he was the starting shortstop for the Philadelphia Phillies from 1898 until 1901. At that point, he jumped to the new American League and the crosstown Philadelphia Athletics. He was their starting shortstop from 1902 until 1904, including the 1902 team that won the American League pennant in the year before the World Series began play.

After batting just .189 in 1904, Cross relinquished the starting role to 19-year-old rookie John Knight for much of 1905, when the Athletics won their second pennant. After batting .266 in his part-time role, Cross regained the starting role in 1906 when Knight was moved to third base to replace Lave Cross. However, he batted just .200, and was replaced as the starter again in 1907, this time by Simon Nicholls.

His major league career ended that season, but Monte Cross remained in baseball, playing in three minor leagues from 1908 to 1911. He umpired 141 games in the Federal League during the 1914 season. In 1915, Cross played semiprofessionally for the Media, Pennsylvania, team in the Delaware County League at age 46.

== College baseball ==
Cross coached the Maine Black Bears baseball team from 1916–1921, the longest tenure of any coach to that point in the program's history. In his six seasons, Maine had a record of 33-33-3. An April 1916 article in the Lewiston Daily Sun said of Cross, "His easy-going, but nevertheless strict instructions and discipline, together with the knowledge of the inside features of the National game, and the manner in which he teaches them, make an everlasting impression on the students, players, and managers."

=== Head coaching record ===
Below is a table of Cross's yearly records as a collegiate head baseball coach.

Record table
Season	Team	Overall	Conference	Standing	Postseason
Maine Black Bears (1916–1921)
1916	Maine	8–4–2			
1917	Maine	2–4			
1918	Maine	3–5			
1919	Maine	8–5			
1920	Maine	7–5			
1921	Maine	5–10–1			
Total:		33–33–3			

== Sports radio ==
In 1923, Cross hosted a show called "Real Baseball Dope" on WIP in Philadelphia, on Mondays and Fridays at 6:45 PM. The show had a run time of fifteen minutes.
