= Larry Thomas (baseball) =

American baseball player (born 1969)

- Pitcher
- Born: October 25, 1969 (age 56); Miami, Florida
- Batted: Right Threw: Left

MLB debut
- August 11, 1995, for the Chicago White Sox

Last MLB appearance
- May 25, 1997, for the Chicago White Sox

MLB statistics
- Win–loss record: 2–3
- Earned run average: 3.02
- Strikeouts: 32
- Stats at Baseball Reference

Teams
- Chicago White Sox (1995–1997)

Larry Wayne Thomas Jr. (born October 25, 1969) is an American retired professional baseball pitcher. During his three seasons in the major leagues (1995–1997), he played for the Chicago White Sox.

== Amateur career ==
Born in Miami, Florida, Thomas played college baseball for the University of Maine Black Bears under head coach John Winkin. In 1990, he played collegiate summer baseball in the Cape Cod Baseball League for the Yarmouth-Dennis Red Sox, where he was named outstanding pitcher at the league's annual all-star game. In 1991, he was named conference pitcher of the year.

== Professional career ==
Thomas was drafted by the White Sox in the 2nd round of the 1991 amateur draft, and played that year with the Class A (Short Season) Utica Blue Sox and Double-A Birmingham Barons. He made his major league debut with the White Sox in 1995. In 1996, he appeared in 57 games for Chicago, posting a 3.23 earned run average. He appeared in only five games for the White Sox in 1997, and after the season was traded with Al Levine to the Texas Rangers for Benji Gil, and was assigned to Texas' Triple-A Oklahoma RedHawks for 1998.
