= Kevin Buckley =

American baseball player (born 1959)

- Designated hitter
- Born: January 16, 1959 (age 67); Quincy, Massachusetts, U.S.
- Batted: Right Threw: Right

MLB debut
- September 4, 1984, for the Texas Rangers

Last MLB appearance
- September 25, 1984, for the Texas Rangers

MLB statistics
- Batting average: .286
- Hits: 2
- Runs: 1
- Stats at Baseball Reference

Teams
- Texas Rangers (1984)

Kevin John Buckley (born January 16, 1959) is an American former Major League Baseball (MLB) player who played for the Texas Rangers in 1984.

A native of Quincy, Massachusetts, Buckley attended Braintree High School prior to attending the University of Maine. In 1978, he played collegiate summer baseball with the Cotuit Kettleers of the Cape Cod Baseball League. With Maine's baseball team, Buckley appeared in the 1981 College World Series. Drafted in the 17th round of the 1981 Major League Baseball draft, Buckley made his major league debut with the Texas Rangers on September 4, 1984. Appearing in 5 career games as a designated hitter, Buckley went 2–7 with 4 strike outs.
