= Paul Kostacopoulos =

American college baseball coach (born 1964)

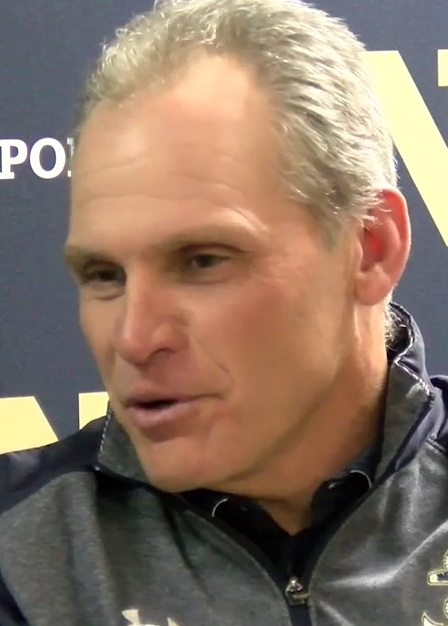
- Kostacopoulos in 2017

Biographical details
- Born: November 28, 1964 (age 61)

Playing career
- 1984–1987: Providence

Coaching career (HC unless noted)
- 1988–1989: Providence (assistant)
- 1990–1996: Providence
- 1997–2005: Maine
- 2006–2023: Navy

Head coaching record
- Overall: 1,017–705–6 (.590)
- Tournaments: NCAA: 2–10 (.167)

Accomplishments and honors

Championships
- Big East tournament (1992); Big East regular season (1995); Big East American Division (1996); America East regular season (2002); 2× America East tournament (2002, 2005); 2× Patriot regular season (2011, 2019); 2× Patriot tournament (2011, 2016)

Awards
- 2× ABCA Northeast Region Coach of the Year (1992, 1995); Big East Coach of the Year (1995); 2× America East Coach of the Year (1997, 2001); 4× Patriot Coach of the Year (2011, 2015, 2016, 2019)

Paul Kostacopoulos (born November 28, 1964) is an American college baseball coach. He was the head coach of the Navy Midshipmen from 2006 until 2023. Prior to Navy, he was the head coach at both Maine and Providence. With the three programs, Kostacopoulos has appeared in a total of five NCAA tournaments.

== Early life ==
Kostacopoulos is the son of longtime Wesleyan University baseball coach Peter Kostacopoulos. He played college baseball at Providence from 1984 to 1987.

== Coaching career ==
=== Providence ===
Kostacopoulos spent two seasons as an assistant at Providence, and became the head coach for the start of the 1990 season. In 1988, he was an assistant coach for the Chatham Anglers, a collegiate summer baseball team in the Cape Cod Baseball League.

Kostacopoulos's first postseason appearance came in the 1991 Big East tournament. Providence then won the tournament in 1992 to advance to the 1992 NCAA tournament, where it went 1–2 and won its second-round game against South Alabama. In 1995, Providence won the Big East regular season title and received an at-large bid to the 1995 NCAA tournament, where it went 0–2. Kostacopoulos was named the 1995 Big East Coach of the Year, New England Coach of the Year, and ABCA Northeast Region Coach of the Year.

Three future Major League Baseball players played under Kostacopoulos at Providence. Lou Merloni (1990–1993) was named conference co-Rookie of the Year in 1990 and conference Player of the Year in 1993. John McDonald (1995–1996) and Keith Reed (1996) also played under Kostacopoulos.

=== Maine ===
Kostacopoulos left Providence to become the head coach of Maine for the start of the 1997 season. He replaced John Winkin, under whom Maine had appeared in six College World Series. In his first four seasons as head coach (1997–2000), Maine finished higher than fourth in the America East only once. In his last five (2001–2005), the team did not finish lower than second and qualified for two NCAA tournaments (2002 and 2005) by winning the America East tournament in those seasons.

Kostacopoulos was named America East Coach of the Year for second-place conference finishes in 1997 and 2001.

=== Navy ===
Kostacopoulos was hired as the head coach of Navy for the start of the 2006 season. As of the end of the 2013 season, Navy has appeared in one NCAA tournament under Kostacopoulos. The appearance came in 2011, when Navy won both the Patriot League regular season and tournament championships. He was named the 2011 and 2015 Patriot League Coach of the Year.

== Head coaching record ==
Below is a table of Kostacopoulos's yearly records as an NCAA head baseball coach.

Statistics overview
| Season | Team | Overall | Conference | Standing | Postseason |
|---|---|---|---|---|---|
Providence Friars (Big East Conference) (1990–1996)
| 1990 | Providence | 27–21 | 11–10 | 5th | |
| 1991 | Providence | 35–16 | 12–8 | T–2nd | |
| 1992 | Providence | 29–23 | 12–8 | 4th | NCAA Regional |
| 1993 | Providence | 21–24 | 8–12 | 7th | |
| 1994 | Providence | 32–21 | 13–8 | 2nd | |
| 1995 | Providence | 44–15 | 16–5 | 1st | NCAA Regional |
| 1996 | Providence | 32–17–1 | 15–10 | T–1st (American) | |
| Providence: | | 220–137–1 (.616) | 87–61 (.588) | | |
Maine Black Bears (America East Conference) (1997–2005)
| 1997 | Maine | 24–27 | 16–8 | 2nd | |
| 1998 | Maine | 24–26 | 12–16 | 5th | |
| 1999 | Maine | 28–28 | 14–14 | T–4th | |
| 2000 | Maine | 25–24 | 14–12 | 5th | |
| 2001 | Maine | 26–15 | 20–8 | 2nd | |
| 2002 | Maine | 40–17 | 16–6 | 1st | NCAA Regional |
| 2003 | Maine | 38–18 | 17–7 | 2nd | |
| 2004 | Maine | 34–21 | 14–7 | T–2nd | |
| 2005 | Maine | 35–19 | 14–7 | T–2nd | |
| Maine: | | 274–195 (.584) | 137–85 (.617) | | |
Navy Midshipmen (Patriot League) (2006–2023)
| 2006 | Navy | 32–21–1 | 8–12 | 5th | |
| 2007 | Navy | 35–20 | 12–8 | 3rd | |
| 2008 | Navy | 32–25–1 | 11–9 | T–2nd | |
| 2009 | Navy | 20–26–1 | 8–12 | 5th | |
| 2010 | Navy | 30–21 | 7–13 | T–5th | |
| 2011 | Navy | 33–25–1 | 12–8 | 1st | NCAA Regional |
| 2012 | Navy | 23–29 | 9–11 | 3rd | |
| 2013 | Navy | 28–23 | 13–7 | 2nd | |
| 2014 | Navy | 23–28 | 9–11 | 4th | |
| 2015 | Navy | 37–20 | 13–7 | 1st | |
| 2016 | Navy | 43–16–1 | 15–5 | 1st | NCAA Regional |
| 2017 | Navy | 37–17 | 16–4 | 1st | |
| 2018 | Navy | 38–16 | 18–7 | T–1st | |
| 2019 | Navy | 39–17 | 18–7 | 1st | |
| 2020 | Navy | 14–1 | 0–0 | | Season canceled due to COVID-19 |
| 2021 | Navy | 17–15 | 11–12 | 2nd (South) | Patriot League tournament |
| 2022 | Navy | 19–26 | 10–15 | 6th | |
| 2023 | Navy | 23–27 | 14–11 | T-3rd | Patriot League tournament |
| Navy: | | 523–373–5 (.583) | 204–141 (.591) | | |
| Total: | | 1,017–705–5 (.590) | | | |
National champion Postseason invitational champion Conference regular season champion Conference regular season and conference tournament champion Division regular season champion Division regular season and conference tournament champion Conference tournament champion

== See also ==
- List of current NCAA Division I baseball coaches
