= Bill Swift =

American baseball player (born 1961)

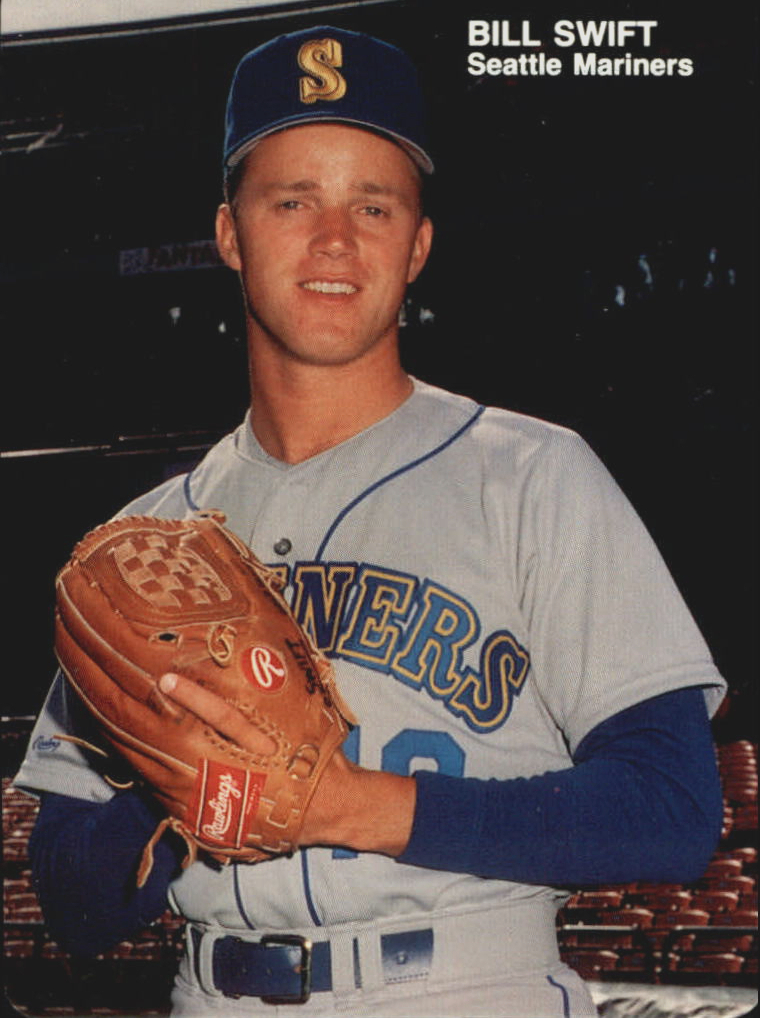
- Swift with the Seattle Mariners c. 1988
- Pitcher
- Born: October 27, 1961 (age 64); Portland, Maine, U.S.
- Batted: Right Threw: Right

MLB debut
- June 7, 1985, for the Seattle Mariners

Last MLB appearance
- September 11, 1998, for the Seattle Mariners

MLB statistics
- Win–loss record: 94–78
- Earned run average: 3.95
- Strikeouts: 767
- Stats at Baseball Reference

Teams
- Seattle Mariners (1985–1986, 1988–1991); San Francisco Giants (1992–1994); Colorado Rockies (1995–1997); Seattle Mariners (1998)

Career highlights and awards
- NL ERA leader (1992)
Medals
Men's baseball
Representing United States
Summer Olympics
Silver medal – second place	1984 Los Angeles	Team
Pan American Games
Bronze medal – third place	1983 Caracas	Team
Baseball World Cup
Bronze medal – third place	1982 Seoul	Team
Intercontinental Cup
Silver medal – second place	1983 Brussels	Team

William Charles Swift (born October 27, 1961) is an American former professional baseball right-handed pitcher. Swift played in Major League Baseball (MLB) for the Seattle Mariners, San Francisco Giants, and Colorado Rockies from 1985 to 1998. Known for his exceptional control and sinker, Swift achieved his greatest success with San Francisco, leading the National League in earned run average in 1992 and finishing as runner-up for the Cy Young Award in 1993.

== Early life and family ==
Swift was born in Portland, Maine, and raised in nearby South Portland as the 14th of 15 children born to Herb and Dorothy Swift. His father Herb, a former semi-professional pitcher who played for the Portland Pilots in the New England League, supported the large family by making billboards for a living. Despite financial challenges, Swift later reflected that his parents "did good for as many kids as they had to feed".

Herb Swift taught his son to pitch using unorthodox methods, including having batters stand on each side of home plate while Bill pitched between them to develop control. The family patriarch named his son William after Ted Williams, explaining, "We'd used up all the names of the saints. I wanted William for Ted Williams."

== High school and amateur career ==
Swift attended South Portland High School, where he played as an outfielder in baseball while also competing in basketball and cross country. He played American Legion Baseball, notably throwing a shutout and batting 17-for-21 during a championship series.

After graduating from South Portland High School, Swift attended the University of Maine, where he played college baseball for the Maine Black Bears baseball team from 1981 to 1984. Originally recruited as an outfielder, Swift was converted to pitcher by head coach John Winkin, a decision that transformed his athletic career.

=== College baseball achievements ===
Swift compiled impressive statistics during his four years at Maine, posting records of 3-1 (3.56 ERA) as a freshman, 10-1 (2.58 ERA) as a sophomore, and 9-3 (2.81 ERA) as a junior. He was named a Second-Team All-American and earned selection to the Eastern Coast Athletic Conference (ECAC) North All-Conference team three times. His career totals of 27 wins and 26 complete games remained school records as of 2017.

Swift helped lead Maine to four consecutive College World Series appearances from 1981 to 1984, compiling a 3-4 record in 70 innings pitched with 54 strikeouts and a .400 batting average (6-for-15) in CWS play. The university later retired his number 8 jersey in recognition of his achievements.

In 1983, during an ECAC playoff game, Swift threw 199 pitches over 13 innings in a contest Maine eventually won in the 18th inning, demonstrating the durability that would mark his professional career.

=== International competition ===
Swift represented the United States in several international competitions, earning bronze medals at the 1982 Amateur World Series and 1983 Pan American Games, as well as a silver medal at the 1983 Intercontinental Cup. His success in international play led to his selection for the 1984 U.S. Olympic baseball team.

Initially reluctant to participate in the Olympics, Swift eventually joined the team and pitched six shutout innings against Nicaragua in his only appearance. The team won the silver medal after losing to Japan in the final. Among his Olympic teammates were future MLB stars Will Clark, Barry Larkin, Cory Snyder, and B. J. Surhoff.

=== Draft history ===
After his junior year at Maine, Swift was selected by the Minnesota Twins in the second round (29th overall) of the 1983 Major League Baseball draft. However, he declined to sign, opting to return to college for his senior year despite warnings that he might not be drafted as highly again. His decision to consult an agent while still a junior led to NCAA sanctions, resulting in Swift being suspended for one-third of his senior season.

Despite the suspension limiting him to a 5-3 record with a 1.77 ERA in his senior year, Swift was selected second overall by the Seattle Mariners in the 1984 Major League Baseball draft, validating his decision to return to school.

== Professional career ==
=== Seattle Mariners (1985–1986, 1988–1991) ===
Following his senior year at Maine, Swift was drafted second overall by the Seattle Mariners in the 1984 MLB draft. After participating in the 1984 Olympics, he began his professional career with the Chattanooga Lookouts, Seattle's Double-A affiliate, where he posted a 2-1 record with a 3.69 ERA in seven starts.

Swift made his MLB debut on June 7, 1985, against the Cleveland Indians. Called up from Double-A after only seven minor league starts, he entered the game in relief of starter Brian Snyder in the second inning and pitched five scoreless innings, allowing only one hit while earning his first major league victory. His manager Chuck Cottier praised Swift's composure, noting, "He comes from a family of 15, so there's not much that shakes him up."

Swift's rookie season included a memorable start at Fenway Park, fulfilling a childhood dream of pitching against his hometown Boston Red Sox. Despite struggling with consistency, finishing 6-10 with a 4.77 ERA, Swift showed flashes of his potential.

The 1986 season proved challenging, as Swift posted a 2-9 record with a 6.51 ERA as a starter. He underwent elbow surgery in June 1987 to remove bone spurs, limiting him to just five games that season.

Swift returned strong in 1988, throwing four consecutive complete games early in the season and setting a record on May 28 against the New York Yankees by inducing 22 groundball outs. He finished 7-3 but was moved to the bullpen late in the season due to inconsistency as a starter.

Finding his niche in relief, Swift emerged as one of the American League's premier setup men by 1991. He appeared in 71 games with a 1.99 ERA, serving primarily as the setup man for closer Mike Jackson. His 17 saves came mostly in the second half when Jackson lost the closer's role.

=== San Francisco Giants (1992–1994) ===
On December 11, 1991, Swift was traded to the San Francisco Giants along with pitchers Mike Jackson and Dave Burba in exchange for outfielder Kevin Mitchell and pitcher Mike Remlinger. The Giants immediately moved Swift from the bullpen to the starting rotation, a decision that would define his career.

==== 1992: ERA championship ====
Swift's transition to starting proved immediately successful. Named the Giants' Opening Day starter by manager Roger Craig, he defeated the Los Angeles Dodgers 5-1, allowing just one run in 7 2/3 innings. He followed with a complete-game shutout against the Atlanta Braves, establishing himself as the ace of the Giants' rotation.

Despite missing time due to shoulder and nerve problems, Swift led all of Major League Baseball with a 2.08 ERA, pitching 164 2/3 innings. His success was built on an exceptional sinker that manager Roger Craig described as "a great sinker" thrown at 92 mph with remarkable movement.

==== 1993: Cy Young runner-up ====
Swift's finest season came in 1993, when he posted a 21-8 record with a 2.82 ERA in 232 2/3 innings pitched. He and teammate John Burkett formed a formidable duo, combining for 43 wins as the Giants challenged for the National League West title.

The 1993 season featured one of the most dramatic pennant races in baseball history. Swift's clutch performance on September 22 against the Houston Astros exemplified his determination. Despite suffering back spasms while batting in the seventh inning, Swift refused to leave the game, telling manager Dusty Baker, "I can go. I want this one." He completed the 1-0 victory, one of his most memorable performances.

Swift earned his 20th victory on September 26 against the San Diego Padres, becoming emotional as he dedicated the win to his father Herb, who had died in the offseason. The Giants finished 103-59, tied with Atlanta for the best record in baseball, but lost the division by one game in the final series.

For his outstanding season, Swift finished second to Greg Maddux in Cy Young Award voting, despite leading the National League in several categories including a 7.5 hits per nine innings rate.

Swift's 1994 season was cut short by the players' strike after posting a 6-6 record with a 3.38 ERA. With the Giants needing to cut payroll, Swift became a free agent following the season.

=== Colorado Rockies (1995–1997) ===
Swift signed a three-year, $12 million contract with the expansion Colorado Rockies, believing his ground-ball style would succeed at high altitude. He was selected as the Opening Day starter for the inaugural game at Coors Field on April 26, 1995, surrendering the first hit in stadium history to Brett Butler.

However, Swift's tenure in Colorado was marked by struggles with both performance and health. The thin air at Coors Field, which Swift had expected to handle well, proved problematic. He posted an 8.75 ERA in his first seven starts, already surrendering five home runs at Coors Field.

Recurring shoulder problems led to multiple disabled list stints, including missing all of August 1995. Swift's only postseason appearance came in Game 3 of the 1995 National League Division Series against Atlanta, where he received a no-decision in Colorado's extra-inning victory.

Following arthroscopic shoulder surgery to repair a damaged labrum, Swift's effectiveness continued to decline. He made only sporadic appearances in 1996 and 1997, struggling with reduced velocity and command. The Rockies released him in August 1997 after he went 0-5 with an 8.28 ERA in his final seven starts.

=== Return to Seattle (1998) ===
At age 36, Swift signed a minor league contract with the Mariners for the 1998 season, earning $325,000 upon making the team. He made 26 starts but posted an 11-8 record with a 5.85 ERA, showing flashes of his former ability while clearly diminished by age and injuries. Despite the poor statistics, Swift received the Mariners' Unsung Hero Award for his veteran leadership.

Swift's final major league appearance came on September 11, 1998, in relief against the Kansas City Royals, where he surrendered five runs in one inning. He was invited to spring training in 1999 but was released after posting a 7.20 ERA in 10 innings. At age 37, Swift announced his retirement from professional baseball.

== Playing style and characteristics ==
Swift was known as a finesse pitcher who relied on exceptional command rather than overpowering velocity. His signature pitch was a heavy sinker thrown in the low 90s that generated numerous ground balls. During his peak years with San Francisco, Swift's sinker was described by manager Roger Craig as moving with remarkable late action that made it difficult for hitters to elevate.

In 1988, Swift set a major league record by forcing 22 groundball outs in a single game against the New York Yankees, demonstrating his ground-ball approach. His career groundball-to-flyball ratio of 2.39 in 1991 represented the highest mark of his career.

Swift's quiet demeanor and unflappable composure became his trademark. Growing up as the 14th of 15 children, he developed a laid-back personality that served him well under pressure. As he once explained, "When you're next to youngest out of 15, that's the way you end up."

== Career statistics and achievements ==
Swift compiled a career record of 94-78 with a 3.95 ERA and 767 strikeouts over 13 seasons. His peak seasons came during his three years with San Francisco (1992-1994), when he posted a combined 35-20 record with a 2.54 ERA.

Major achievements include:

- National League ERA leader (1992): 2.08
- Cy Young Award runner-up (1993): finished second to Greg Maddux
- 21-win season (1993): tied for most wins in National League
- Four consecutive College World Series appearances (1981-1984)
- Olympic silver medal (1984)

== Post-playing career ==
=== Coaching career ===
On December 22, 1999, USA Today named Swift as one of Maine's best athletes of the 20th century. Swift was inducted into the inaugural class of the New England Baseball Hall of Fame on January 25, 2015.

Following his retirement, Swift served as baseball coach at Scottsdale Christian Academy in Phoenix, Arizona from 2001 to 2013. He transformed the program from 11 players to 32, leading the school to four Metro League championships and 10 state playoff appearances. Under his leadership, the program also won two state championships.

In 2013, Swift was hired as head baseball coach at Arizona Christian University. During his five-year tenure, he compiled 89 wins, the most of any coach in school history, while building the program's competitiveness and reputation. Swift resigned following the 2018 season to spend more time with his family.

=== Personal life ===
Swift married Michelle Kenney, a University of Maine student from Madison, Maine, following his rookie season in 1985. The couple has three daughters: Aubrey, Mackenzie, and Brynlie. The family resides in Arizona, where Swift has remained active in baseball coaching and instruction.

Despite opportunities to coach at the professional level, Swift has chosen to remain focused on amateur baseball and family life. When asked about potential major league coaching positions, he explained, "It's a grind... They don't make a lot of money and it's a long day and you're away from your family. At this point I have no desire for that again."

== Legacy and honors ==
Swift's achievements have been recognized through numerous honors:

- Inducted into the Maine Sports Hall of Fame (1994)
- Inducted into the Maine Baseball Hall of Fame (2000)
- Named sixth greatest athlete from Maine by Sports Illustrated (1999)
- Inducted into the New England Baseball Hall of Fame (2015)
- Inducted into the University of Maine Sports Hall of Fame (1991)
- Number 8 jersey retired by University of Maine

== See also ==
- List of Major League Baseball annual ERA leaders
- Maine Black Bears baseball
- Baseball at the 1984 Summer Olympics
