= Nick Derba =

American baseball coach and catcher (born 1985)

Current position
- Title: Head coach
- Team: Maine
- Conference: America East
- Record: 198–274 (.419)

Biographical details
- Born: September 9, 1985 (age 41); College Point, New York, U.S.

Playing career
- 2004–2007: Manhattan
- 2007: Batavia Muckdogs
- 2007: Swing of the Quad Cities
- 2008–2010: Palm Beach Cardinals
- 2009–2012: Springfield Cardinals
- 2010–2012: Memphis Redbirds
- Position: Catcher

Coaching career (HC unless noted)
- 2010–2011: NJIT (Asst.)
- 2013: Manhattan (Asst.)
- 2014–2016: Maine (Asst.)
- 2017–present: Maine

Head coaching record
- Overall: 198–274 (.419)
- Tournaments: NCAA: 0–2

Accomplishments and honors

Championships
- 2× America East regular season (2022, 2023); America East tournament (2023)

Awards
- 2× America East Coach of the Year (2022, 2023)

Nicholas Joseph Derba (born November 9, 1985) is an American baseball coach and former catcher, who is the current head baseball coach of the Maine Black Bears. He played college baseball at Manhattan from 2004 to 2007, before playing professionally from 2007 to 2012.

== Playing career ==
Derba played college baseball at Manhattan College. While at Manhattan, he played three years (2004-2006) of collegiate summer baseball for the Chatham A's of the Cape Cod Baseball League, and returned to the A's as hitting and catchers coach in 2013. He was selected by the St. Louis Cardinals in the 30th round of the 2007 MLB draft.

== Head coaching record ==
This table depicts Derba's record as a head coach.

Record table
Season	Team	Overall	Conference	Standing	Postseason
Maine Black Bears (America East Conference) (2017–present)
2017	Maine	25–29	8–12	6th (7)	America East Tournament
2018	Maine	20–34	12–12	5th (7)	America East Tournament
2019	Maine	15–34	11–12	5th (7)	America East Tournament
2020	Maine	1–12	0–0		Season canceled due to COVID-19
2021	Maine	22–22	16–17	2nd (Division A)	America East Tournament
2022	Maine	27–22	21–9	1st (Division A)	America East Tournament
2023	Maine	32–21	19–5	1st	NCAA regional
2024	Maine	12–37	8–15	7th	
2025	Maine	20–31	13–11	4th	America East Tournament
2026	Maine	24–32	14–10	3rd	America East Tournament
Maine:		198–274 (.419)	122–103 (.542)		
Total:		198–274 (.419)			
National champion Postseason invitational champion Conference regular season champion Conference regular season and conference tournament champion Division regular season champion Division regular season and conference tournament champion Conference tournament champion
