= Bert Roberge =

American baseball player (born 1954)

- Pitcher
- Born: October 3, 1954 (age 71); Lewiston, Maine, U.S.
- Batted: Right Threw: Right

MLB debut
- May 28, 1979, for the Houston Astros

Last MLB appearance
- October 4, 1986, for the Montreal Expos

MLB statistics
- Win–loss record: 12–12
- Earned run average: 3.98
- Strikeouts: 119
- Stats at Baseball Reference

Teams
- Houston Astros (1979–1980, 1982); Chicago White Sox (1984); Montreal Expos (1985–1986)

Bertrand Roland Roberge (born October 3, 1954) is an American former professional baseball pitcher. He played in Major League Baseball for the Houston Astros, Chicago White Sox, and Montreal Expos from 1979 through 1986.

== Amateur career ==
A native of Auburn, Maine, Roberge attended the University of Maine, where he played college baseball for the Maine Black Bears baseball team from 1974 to 1977. He set the school career ERA record at Maine, at 1.82. In 1975, he played collegiate summer baseball in the Cape Cod Baseball League for the Yarmouth-Dennis Red Sox. He was selected by the Astros in the 17th round of the 1976 MLB draft.

== Professional career ==
In his 1979 rookie season with the Houston Astros, he appeared in 26 games, posting a 3-0 record with a 1.69 ERA. He split the following four seasons between the Astros and Triple-A Tucson. Prior to the 1984 season, he signed with the White Sox as a free agent, and appeared in 21 games for Chicago that year. After the season, the White Sox traded Roberge to the Montreal Expos, where he spent his final two big league seasons.

In 219.1 innings pitched in 146 appearances, Roberge handled 56 total chances (20 putouts, 36 assists) without an error in his MLB career for a perfect 1.000 fielding percentage.

== After baseball ==
Roberge currently works in sales for Northeast Growers. He is a resident of Auburn, Maine.

== Sources ==
- Career statistics from Baseball Reference · Baseball Reference (Minors) · Retrosheet · Baseball Almanac
