= List of Maine Black Bears baseball seasons =

This is a list of Maine Black Bears baseball seasons. The Maine Black Bears baseball team represents the University of Maine and is a member of the America East Conference of the NCAA Division I.

The Huskies have made six College World Series appearances and 17 appearances in the NCAA Division I Baseball Championship.

== Season results ==
National champions
College World Series berth
NCAA tournament berth
Conference Tournament champions
Conference/Division Regular season Champions

Season	Head coach	Conference	Season results									Tournament Results		Final Poll (Note: Collegiate Baseball began team rankings in 1959 and ceased operations in 2024. D1Baseball polls are used from 2019.)
Season	Head coach	Conference	Overall				Conference (Note: Maine played as part of the New England Conference from 1937–1943, and the Yankee Conference from 1949–1979. They competed within the Eastern Collegiate Athletic Conference New England Division from 1982–1989, and joined the America East Conference, then known as the North Atlantic Conference, in 1990.)					Conference (Note: The New England Conference and Yankee Conference did not hold a postseason tournament. Maine participated in the ECAC tournament from 1976–1989, during which the tournament served as an automatic qualifier to the NCAA Tournament. From 1976–1983, it was held by division with Maine competing in the New England Division. The North Atlantic Conference (later America East Conference) launched its tournament in 1993.)	Postseason (Note: Postseason play involving the NCAA Division I Baseball Championship began in 1947.)	CB/D1B
Season	Head coach	Conference	Wins	Losses	Ties	%	Wins	Losses	Ties	%	Finish (Members)	Conference	Postseason	CB/D1B
Maine Black Bears
1881	None	Independent	3	3	0	.500	N/A							
1882	None	Independent	1	1	0	.500	N/A							
1883	None	Independent	3	3	0	.500	N/A							
1884	None	Independent	3	0	0	1.000	N/A							
1885	None	Independent	4	2	0	.667	N/A							
1886	None	Independent	4	6	0	.400	N/A							
1887	None	Independent	4	6	1	.409	N/A							
1888	None	Independent	10	2	0	.833	N/A							
1889	None	Independent	6	4	0	.600	N/A							
1890	None	Independent	2	4	0	.333	N/A							
1891	None	Independent	4	3	0	.571	N/A							
1892	No team													
1893	None	Independent	1	3	0	.250	N/A							
1894	Harry Miller	Independent	5	7	0	.417	N/A							
1895	Harry Miller	Independent	8	4	0	.667	N/A							
1896	Jack Abbott	Independent	5	4	0	.556	N/A							
1897	W. W. Bustard	Independent	9	4	0	.692	N/A							
1898	W. W. Bustard	Independent	9	4	0	.692	N/A							
1899	William Magill	Independent	11	2	0	.846	N/A							
1900	William Magill	Independent	7	4	0	.636	N/A							
1901	William Magill	Independent	6	7	0	.462	N/A							
1902	Frank Rudderham	Independent	11	8	0	.579	N/A							
1903	Frank Rudderham	Independent	11	4	0	.733	N/A							
1904	Frank Rudderham	Independent	4	6	0	.400	N/A							
1905	Frank Rudderham	Independent	7	9	0	.438	N/A							
1906	E. G. Butman	Independent	3	12	0	.200	N/A							
1907	W. J. Fitzmaurice	Independent	1	12	0	.077	N/A							
1908	W. J. Fitzmaurice	Independent	6	6	0	.500	N/A							
1909	P. J. Noonan	Independent	7	5	0	.583	N/A							
1910	Pat Keefe	Independent	8	4	0	.667	N/A							
1911	Edgar Wingard	Independent	3	8	0	.273	N/A							
1912	George Magoon	Independent	7	6	1	.536	N/A							
1913	George Magoon	Independent	5	7	0	.417	N/A							
1914	John Phelan	Independent	5	6	0	.455	N/A							
1915	John Phelan	Independent	7	9	0	.438	N/A							
1916	Monte Cross	Independent	8	4	2	.643	N/A							
1917	Monte Cross	Independent	2	4	0	.333	N/A							
1918	Monte Cross	Independent	3	5	0	.375	N/A							
1919	Monte Cross	Independent	8	5	0	.615	N/A							
1920	Monte Cross	Independent	7	5	0	.583	N/A							
1921	Monte Cross	Independent	5	10	1	.344	N/A							
1922	Wilkie Clark	Independent	8	7	0	.533	N/A							
1923	Wilkie Clark	Independent	6	8	0	.429	N/A							
1924	Joseph Murphy	Independent	5	8	0	.385	N/A							
1925	Joseph Murphy	Independent	5	6	1	.458	N/A							
1926	Fred Brice	Independent	6	5	0	.545	N/A							
1927	Fred Brice	Independent	7	4	0	.636	N/A							
1928	Fred Brice	Independent	3	9	0	.250	N/A							
1929	Fred Brice	Independent	8	6	0	.571	N/A							
1930	Fred Brice	Independent	8	7	0	.533	N/A							
1931	Fred Brice	Independent	7	6	0	.538	N/A							
1932	Fred Brice	Independent	9	5	0	.643	N/A							
1933	Fred Brice	Independent	7	5	0	.583	N/A							
1934	Fred Brice	Independent	5	7	0	.417	N/A							
1935	Fred Brice	Independent	7	6	0	.538	N/A							
1936	William C. Kenyon	Independent	6	6	0	.500	N/A							
1937	William C. Kenyon	New England	9	5	1	.633	3	3	0	.500	2nd	N/A		
1938	William C. Kenyon	New England	11	7	0	.611	6	2	0	.750	1st	N/A		
1939	William C. Kenyon	New England	4	13	0	.235	0	8	0	.000	5th	N/A		
1940	William C. Kenyon	New England	5	11	0	.313	1	6	0	.143	5th	N/A		
1941	William C. Kenyon	New England	4	12	0	.250	1	6	0	.143	5th	N/A		
1942	William C. Kenyon	New England	6	8	0	.429	3	5	0	.375	T-3rd	N/A		
1943	William C. Kenyon	New England	4	8	0	.333	3	5	0	.375	4th	N/A		
1944	No team													
1945	William C. Kenyon	Independent	2	7	0	.222	N/A						N/A	
1946	William C. Kenyon	Independent	3	8	0	.273	N/A						N/A	
1947	William C. Kenyon	Independent	7	6	0	.538	N/A						—	—
1948	William C. Kenyon	Independent	2	9	1	.208	N/A						—	—
1949	William C. Kenyon	Yankee	4	11	0	.267	1	4	0	.200	5th	—	—	—
1950	Mike Lude	Yankee	12	9	0	.571	4	1	0	.800	1st	—	—	—
1951	Mike Lude	Yankee	10	10	0	.500	2	4	0	.333	T-5th	—	—	—
1952	Tubby Raymond	Yankee	11	10	1	.523	3	2	0	.600	3rd	—	—	—
1953	Tubby Raymond	Yankee	11	7	0	.611	2	2	0	.500	3rd	—	—	—
1954	Walter Anderson	Yankee	14	9	0	.609	3	3	0	.500	3rd	—	—	—
1955	Walter Anderson	Yankee	12	10	0	.545	2	5	0	.286	5th	—	—	—
1956	Walter Anderson	Yankee	7	11	1	.395	0	7	0	.000	6th	—	—	—
1957	Jack Butterfield	Yankee	6	14	0	.300	3	5	0	.375	T-4th	—	—	—
1958	Jack Butterfield	Yankee	12	9	0	.571	5	3	0	.625	3rd	—	—	—
1959	Jack Butterfield	Yankee	12	8	0	.600	7	3	0	.700	2nd	—	—	—
1960	Jack Butterfield	Yankee	12	8	0	.600	8	2	0	.800	T-1st	—	—	—
1961	Jack Butterfield	Yankee	9	13	1	.413	2	6	1	.278	5th	—	—	—
1962	Jack Butterfield	Yankee	9	14	0	.391	5	5	0	.500	3rd	—	—	—
1963	Jack Butterfield	Yankee	9	12	0	.429	4	5	0	.444	4th	—	—	—
1964	Jack Butterfield	Yankee	21	8	0	.724	8	2	0	.800	1st	—	College World Series, 3rd	3
1965	Jack Butterfield	Yankee	14	7	0	.667	6	4	0	.600	T-3rd	—	—	—
1966	Jack Butterfield	Yankee	15	9	1	.620	7	3	0	.700	T-1st	—	—	—
1967	Jack Butterfield	Yankee	15	7	0	.682	5	5	0	.500	3rd	—	—	—
1968	Jack Butterfield	Yankee	10	9	0	.526	3	7	0	.300	T-4th	—	—	—
1969	Jack Butterfield	Yankee	12	12	0	.500	6	4	0	.600	T-2nd	—	—	—
1970	Jack Butterfield	Yankee	18	6	0	.750	8	2	0	.800	T-1st	—	—	—
1971	Jack Butterfield	Yankee	16	12	0	.571	6	9	0	.400	3rd	—	—	—
1972	Jack Butterfield	Yankee	20	7	0	.741	8	4	0	.667	T-2nd	—	—	—
1973	Jack Butterfield	Yankee	15	9	0	.625	4	4	0	.500	3rd	—	—	—
1974	Jack Butterfield	Yankee	15	5	0	.750	4	4	0	.500	T-3rd	—	—	—
1975	John Winkin	Yankee	25	8	1	.750	5	2	1	.688	1st	—	NCAA Regional	21
1976	John Winkin	Yankee	29	9	0	.763	6	2	0	.750	2nd	Champion	College World Series, 4th	4
1977	John Winkin	Yankee	24	11	0	.686	5	3	0	.625	T-2nd	—	—	—
1978	John Winkin	Yankee	20	9	0	.690	4	4	0	.500	3rd	—	—	—
1979	John Winkin	Yankee	23	9	0	.719	7	3	0	.700	T-1st	—	—	—
1980	John Winkin	Independent	23	13	1	.635	N/A					Champion	NCAA Regional	—
1981	John Winkin	Independent	32	14	0	.696	N/A					Champion	College World Series, T-7th	7
1982	John Winkin	ECAC	35	13	0	.729	10	3	0	.769	1st	Champion	College World Series, T-3rd	3
1983	John Winkin	ECAC	29	16	0	.644	11	1	0	.917	1st	Champion	College World Series, T-7th	7
1984	John Winkin	ECAC	33	20	0	.623	15	3	0	.833	1st	Champion	College World Series, T-7th	8
1985	John Winkin	ECAC	38	17	0	.691	11	0	0	1.000	1st	1–2	—	—
1986	John Winkin	ECAC	41	23	0	.641	13	1	0	.929	1st	Champion	College World Series, T-7th	7
1987	John Winkin	ECAC	24	23	0	.511	8	6	0	.571	3rd	—	—	—
1988	John Winkin	ECAC	33	24	0	.579	10	2	0	.833	1st	1–2	—	—
1989	John Winkin	ECAC	32	26	0	.552	14	1	0	.933	1st	2–2	—	—
1990	John Winkin	North Atlantic/America East	42	20	0	.677	12	3	0	.800	1st	—	NCAA Regional	—
1991	John Winkin	North Atlantic/America East	48	18	0	.727	14	1	0	.933	1st	—	NCAA Regional	—
1992	John Winkin	North Atlantic/America East	19	24	1	.443	11	11	0	.500	5th	—	—	—
1993	John Winkin	North Atlantic/America East	33	27	0	.550	22	4	0	.846	1st	Champion	NCAA Regional	—
1994	John Winkin	North Atlantic/America East	20	33	0	.377	13	12	0	.520	4th	0–2	—	—
1995	John Winkin	North Atlantic/America East	20	37	0	.351	11	13	0	.458	6th	0–2	—	—
1996	John Winkin	North Atlantic/America East	19	36	0	.345	12	8	0	.600	T-2nd	1–2	—	—
1997	Paul Kostacopoulos	North Atlantic/America East	24	27	0	.471	16	8	0	.667	2nd	0–2	—	—
1998	Paul Kostacopoulos	North Atlantic/America East	24	26	0	.480	12	16	0	.429	5th	—	—	—
1999	Paul Kostacopoulos	North Atlantic/America East	28	28	0	.500	14	14	0	.500	T-4th	1–2	—	—
2000	Paul Kostacopoulos	North Atlantic/America East	25	24	0	.510	14	12	0	.538	5th	—	—	—
2001	Paul Kostacopoulos	North Atlantic/America East	36	15	0	.706	20	8	0	.714	2nd	0–2	—	—
2002	Paul Kostacopoulos	North Atlantic/America East	40	17	0	.702	16	6	0	.727	1st	Champion	NCAA Regional	—
2003	Paul Kostacopoulos	North Atlantic/America East	38	18	0	.679	17	7	0	.708	2nd	1–2	—	—
2004	Paul Kostacopoulos	North Atlantic/America East	34	21	0	.618	14	7	0	.667	T-2nd	2–2	—	—
2005	Paul Kostacopoulos	North Atlantic/America East	35	19	0	.648	14	7	0	.667	T-2nd	Champion	NCAA Regional	—
2006	Steve Trimper	North Atlantic/America East	35	22	1	.612	13	9	0	.591	3rd	Champion	NCAA Regional	—
2007	Steve Trimper	North Atlantic/America East	22	31	0	.415	12	11	0	.522	4th	1–2	—	—
2008	Steve Trimper	North Atlantic/America East	20	28	1	.418	8	15	0	.348	7th	—	—	—
2009	Steve Trimper	North Atlantic/America East	32	23	0	.582	13	11	0	.542	5th	—	—	—
2010	Steve Trimper	North Atlantic/America East	34	22	0	.607	17	7	0	.708	2nd	0–2	—	—
2011	Steve Trimper	North Atlantic/America East	33	24	0	.579	18	6	0	.750	2nd	Champion	NCAA Regional	—
2012	Steve Trimper	North Atlantic/America East	28	28	0	.500	11	11	0	.500	4th	2–2	—	—
2013	Steve Trimper	North Atlantic/America East	37	22	0	.627	20	9	0	.690	1st	2–2	—	—
2014	Steve Trimper	North Atlantic/America East	24	29	0	.453	10	11	0	.476	T-4th	0–2	—	—
2015	Steve Trimper	North Atlantic/America East	24	28	0	.462	10	10	0	.500	T-3rd	0–2	—	—
2016	Steve Trimper	North Atlantic/America East	20	35	0	.364	8	15	0	.348	6th	1–2	—	—
2017	Nick Derba	North Atlantic/America East	25	29	0	.463	8	12	0	.400	6th	4–2	—	—
2018	Nick Derba	North Atlantic/America East	20	34	0	.370	12	12	0	.500	5th	2–2	—	—
2019	Nick Derba	North Atlantic/America East	15	34	0	.306	11	12	0	.478	5th	0–2	—	—
2020	Nick Derba	North Atlantic/America East	1	12	0	.077	Season canceled due to coronavirus pandemic							
2021	Nick Derba	North Atlantic/America East	22	22	0	.500	16	17	0	.485	2nd (Division A)	1–2	—	—
2022	Nick Derba	North Atlantic/America East	27	22	0	.551	21	9	0	.700	1st (Division A)	0–2	—	—
2023	Nick Derba	North Atlantic/America East	32	21	0	.604	19	5	0	.792	1st	Champion	NCAA Regional	—
2024	Nick Derba	North Atlantic/America East	12	37	0	.245	8	15	0	.348	7th	—	—	—
2025	Nick Derba	North Atlantic/America East	20	31	0	.392	13	11	0	.542	4th	0–1	—	—
2026	Nick Derba	North Atlantic/America East	24	32	0	.429	14	10	0	.583	3rd	3–2	—	—

=== Notes ===
Sources:
