= Bill Currier (baseball) =

American baseball player and coach

Current position
- Title: Head coach
- Team: Fairfield
- Conference: MAAC
- Record: 401–316–0 (.559)

Biographical details
- Born: January 27, 1960 (age 66); Essex Junction, Vermont, U.S.

Playing career
- 1979–1981: Vermont

Coaching career (HC unless noted)
- 1983–1984: Vermont (assistant)
- 1985–1986: Western Carolina (assistant)
- 1987: Mitchell JC
- 1988–2009: Vermont
- 2010: Tennessee (assistant)
- 2011: Fairfield (assistant)
- 2012–present: Fairfield

Head coaching record
- Overall: 887–807–2 (.524)
- Tournaments: NCAA: 2–6

Accomplishments and honors

Championships
- 2 America East (2003, 2006); 4 MAAC (2016, 2021, 2023, 2024); 2 MAAC tournament (2016, 2025)

Awards
- Coach of the Year; 3x America East (2002, 2003, 2006); 3x MAAC (2012, 2016, 2021)

Willard F. Currier (born January 27, 1960) is an American college baseball coach, currently serving as the head baseball coach for the Fairfield Stags. He was named to that position prior to the 2012 NCAA Division I baseball season. He was previously the head coach at Vermont (its winningest ever) before the university cut the baseball program after the 2009 season.

== Playing career ==
Currier played at Vermont under Jack Leggett from 1979 through 1981. He was drafted in the sixth round of the 1981 MLB draft by the Philadelphia Phillies. He played three seasons in the Phillies organization in Class A.

== Coaching career ==
He returned to Vermont as an assistant coach and completed his degree in 1984. He then assisted Leggett at Western Carolina before earning his first head coaching job at Mitchell College, then a junior college. In 1988, Currier succeeded Mike Stone as head coach at Vermont. Currier would coach the Catamounts for 22 seasons, compiling a 486–470 record prior to the program's end in 2009. He was named America East Coach of the Year three times. He then served the 2010 season at Tennessee before being named head coach in waiting at Fairfield for the 2011 season and being elevated to the top job in 2012.

At Fairfield, Currier was named the MAAC Coach of the Year in 2012, his first season as the Stags' head coach. That year, the team went 14–10 in MAAC play and reached the playoffs for the first time since 2000. Senior shortstop Larry Cornelia and sophomore outfielder Ryan Plourde were both all-conference selections, giving Fairfield multiple all-league honorees for the first time since 2008. In 2014, Fairfield went 32-24 (15-8 MAAC), finishing third in the program's first 30-win season. Plourde, Jake Salpietro, and EJ Ashworth were named to the All-MAAC First Team. The Stags won their first two games in the MAAC Tournament, defeating #6 seed Manhattan and #2 Siena before losses to top-seeded Canisius and Siena knocked them out of the tournament.

== Head coaching record ==
Below is a table of Currier's yearly records as an NCAA head baseball coach.

Record table
| Season | Team | Overall | Conference | Standing | Postseason |
|---|---|---|---|---|---|
Vermont Catamounts (Eastern College Athletic Conference) (1988–1989)
| 1988 | Vermont | 10–21 | 5–9 | 5th | |
| 1989 | Vermont | 11–19 | 4–11 | 6th | |
| : | | | 9–20–0 (.310) | | |
Vermont Catamounts (North Atlantic/America East (Note: The America East was known as the North Atlantic Conference from 1990 to 1996.)) (1990–2009)
| 1990 | Vermont | 18–13 | 5–9 | 4th | |
| 1991 | Vermont | 18–14 | 6–8 | 3rd | |
| 1992 | Vermont | 28–13 | 13–9 | 3rd | ECAC Tournament |
| 1993 | Vermont | 25–18 | 15–13 | 4th | North Atlantic tournament (Note: In this season, all of the North Atlantic's members qualified for the postseason.) |
| 1994 | Vermont | 16–22 | 10–13 | 6th | North Atlantic tournament |
| 1995 | Vermont | 27–18 | 15–9 | 3rd | North Atlantic tournament |
| 1996 | Vermont | 12–21–1 | 8–12 | 7th | |
| 1997 | Vermont | 27–19 | 15–9 | 3rd | America East tournament |
| 1998 | Vermont | 26–21 | 15–12 | 3rd | America East tournament |
| 1999 | Vermont | 21–26 | 10–18 | 6th | |
| 2000 | Vermont | 28–22 | 16–10 | 3rd | America East tournament |
| 2001 | Vermont | 23–22 | 10–17 | T–6th | |
| 2002 | Vermont | 27–22 | 14–8 | 2nd | America East tournament |
| 2003 | Vermont | 32–14 | 17–5 | 1st | America East tournament |
| 2004 | Vermont | 18–26 | 10–11 | 5th | |
| 2005 | Vermont | 29–19 | 14–7 | T–2nd | America East tournament |
| 2006 | Vermont | 19–34 | 16–8 | 1st | America East tournament |
| 2007 | Vermont | 21–29–1 | 10–13 | 5th | |
| 2008 | Vermont | 27–24 | 12–11 | 4th | America East tournament |
| 2009 | Vermont | 23–33 | 14–10 | T–3rd | America East tournament |
| Vermont: | | 486–491–2 (.497) | 245–213–0 (.535) | | |
Fairfield Stags (Metro Atlantic Athletic Conference) (2012–present)
| 2012 | Fairfield | 27–28 | 14–10 | 3rd | MAAC tournament |
| 2013 | Fairfield | 20–29 | 11–13 | T–5th | |
| 2014 | Fairfield | 32–24 | 15–8 | 3rd | MAAC tournament |
| 2015 | Fairfield | 14–28 | 7–11 | 8th | |
| 2016 | Fairfield | 32–24 | 21–7 | 1st | NCAA Regional |
| 2017 | Fairfield | 31–24 | 17–7 | 1st | MAAC tournament |
| 2018 | Fairfield | 22–29 | 9–14 | 9th | |
| 2019 | Fairfield | 35–25 | 15–9 | T-3rd | |
| 2020 | Fairfield | 2–9 | 0–0 | | Season canceled due to COVID-19 |
| 2021 | Fairfield | 39–5 | 33–1 | 1st | NCAA Regional |
| 2022 | Fairfield | 31–21 | 18–5 | 1st | MAAC tournament |
| 2023 | Fairfield | 37–18 | 16–5 | 1st | MAAC tournament |
| 2024 | Fairfield | 34–24 | 20–4 | T-1st | MAAC tournament |
| 2025 | Fairfield | 39–19 | 21–8 | 2nd | NCAA Regional |
| 2026 | Fairfield | 6-9 | 4-2 | | |
| Fairfield: | | 401–316–0 (.559) | 221–104–0 (.680) | | |
| Total: | | 887–807–2 (.524) | | | |
National champion Postseason invitational champion Conference regular season champion Conference regular season and conference tournament champion Division regular season champion Division regular season and conference tournament champion Conference tournament champion

== See also ==
- List of current NCAA Division I baseball coaches
