= Neil McPhee =

American baseball coach

Biographical details
- Born: October 14, 1943 (age 83); Needham, Massachusetts, U.S.

Playing career

Baseball
- 1962–1965: Northeastern

Ice Hockey
- 1961–1965: Northeastern
- Position: 2B

Coaching career (HC unless noted)
- 1968–1985: Newton South HS
- 1986–2014: Northeastern

Head coaching record
- Overall: 697–623–4

Neil Patrick McPhee (born October 14, 1943) is an American former college baseball coach and second baseman. He played college baseball and college hockey at Northeastern University from 1961 to 1965. He was the head coach of the Northeastern Huskies baseball program from 1986 to 2014.

== Playing career ==
McPhee was a standout second baseman at Northeastern for four seasons, including a trip to the 1964 NCAA tournament. McPhee also played ice hockey for the Huskies, completing two seasons before losing his senior season to a broken arm. The Minnesota Twins made him a fifth round pick in the 1965 MLB draft, and he played three seasons in the Twins organization, reaching Class-A. McPhee was inducted into the NU Athletic Hall of Fame in 1980.

== Coaching career ==
In 1967, McPhee hung up his spikes and turned to coaching. He began at Newton South High School in Newton, Massachusetts, where he coached baseball and ice hockey from 1967 to 1985. After several league titles and appearances in Eastern Massachusetts tournaments, McPhee was hired as the tenth head baseball coach at Northeastern. In his 28 years with the Huskies, he claimed three Conference Tournament titles (all in the America East Conference), two regular season crowns, and appeared in three NCAA tournaments. He saw fourteen players drafted, including Carlos Peña and Adam Ottavino; several other players have signed professional contracts. McPhee led the Huskies to nineteen winning seasons and was named NAC Coach of the Year twice. After he announced his planned retirement at the close of the 2014 season, the Huskies named Mike Glavine, another McPhee product who played in the major leagues, as his successor. Glavine succeeded McPhee following the end of the season, in which Northeastern finished 5th in the CAA and went 1-2 in the conference tournament.

== Head coaching record ==
This table shows McPhee's record as a head coach at the Division I level.

Record table
Season	Team	Overall	Conference	Standing	Postseason
Northeastern (North Atlantic/America East Conference) (1986–2005)
1986	Northeastern	25–14	9–5	2nd	
1987	Northeastern	20–14	9–6		
1988	Northeastern	19–23–1	7–8	5th	
1989	Northeastern	21–20–1	5–10		
1990	Northeastern	26–20	9–6	3rd	
1991	Northeastern	35–15	12–3	2nd	
1992	Northeastern	22–18–1	16–12	4th	
1993	Northeastern	17–19	7–14	7th	NAC tournament (Note: All eight of the NAC's teams qualified for the tournament in 1993.)
1994	Northeastern	35–16	18–6	2nd	NCAA Regional
1995	Northeastern	29–17	16–8	2nd	NAC tournament (Note: All eight of the NAC's teams qualified for the tournament in 1995.)
1996	Northeastern	18–26	11–11	5th	NAC tournament (Note: The top six finishers of the NAC's nine teams qualified for the tournament in 1996.)
1997	Northeastern	33–19	12–12	5th	NCAA Regional
1998	Northeastern	26–22	17–9	2nd	AEC tournament (Note: The top four finishers of the AEC's eight teams qualified for the tournament in 1998.)
1999	Northeastern	28–21	18–10	3rd	AEC tournament (Note: The top four finishers of the AEC's eight teams qualified for the tournament in 1999.)
2000	Northeastern	25–24	15–11	4th	AEC tournament (Note: The top four finishers of the AEC's eight teams qualified for the tournament in 2000.)
2001	Northeastern	19–32	11–17	4th	AEC tournament (Note: The top four finishers of the AEC's eight teams qualified for the tournament in 2001.)
2002	Northeastern	29–22	11–11	3rd	AEC tournament (Note: The top four finishers of the AEC's seven teams qualified for the tournament in 2002.)
2003	Northeastern	27–24	12–10	4th	NCAA Regional
2004	Northeastern	28–20	14–6	1st	AEC tournament (Note: The top four finishers of the AEC's eight teams qualified for the tournament in 2004.)
2005	Northeastern	26–23	14–6	1st	AEC tournament (Note: The top four finishers of the AEC's eight teams qualified for the tournament in 2005.)
Northeastern (AEC):		508–419–3	243–181		
Northeastern (Colonial Athletic Association) (2006–2014)
2006	Northeastern	27–23	19–10	3rd	
2007	Northeastern	24–22	12–17	8th	
2008	Northeastern	25–26–1	12–17–1	7th	
2009	Northeastern	28–25	13–11	4th	CAA Tournament (Note: The top six finishers of the CAA's eleven teams qualified for the tournament in 2009.)
2010	Northeastern	13–31	5–19	11th	
2011	Northeastern	18–33	12–18	9th	
2012	Northeastern	23–28	13–17	8th	
2013	Northeastern	31–26	12–15	7th	CAA tournament (Note: The top six of the CAA's eight eligible teams qualified for the tournament in 2013. Old Dominion and Georgia State were ineligible.)
Northeastern (CAA):		189–214–1	98–124–1		
Total:		697–652–4			
National champion Postseason invitational champion Conference regular season champion Conference regular season and conference tournament champion Division regular season champion Division regular season and conference tournament champion Conference tournament champion
