= America East Conference baseball tournament =

- Conference baseball championship
- Sport: College baseball
- Conference: America East Conference
- Number of teams: 6
- Format: Double-elimination
- Current stadium: Binghamton Baseball Complex
- Current location: Vestal, NY
- Played: 1993–present
- Last contest: 2026
- Current champion: Binghamton
- Most championships: Binghamton (7)
- Official website: americaeast.com/baseball

Host stadiums
- List: Binghamton Baseball Complex (2023-2024, 2026) Mahaney Diamond (1996, 2002, 2004, 2018, 2022, 2025) Edward A. LeLacheur Park (2013–17) Joe Nathan Field (2011–12) Varsity Field (2010, 2019) Pete Sylvester Field (2009) Farmingdale State Baseball Stadium (2007–08) Centennial Field (2003, 2005–06) Frawley Stadium (1995, 1997–2001) Friedman Diamond (1994) Delaware Diamond (1993)

Host locations
- List: Binghamton, NY (2010, 2019, 2023-2024, 2026) Orono, ME (1996, 2002, 2004, 2018, 2022, 2025) Lowell, MA (2013–17) Stony Brook, NY (2011–12) Endicott, NY (2009) Farmingdale, NY (2007–08) Burlington, VT (2003, 2005–06) Wilmington, DE (1995, 1997–2001) Brookline, MA (1994) Newark, DE (1993)

The America East Conference baseball tournament, officially known as the America East Conference baseball championship, is the conference baseball championship of the NCAA Division I America East Conference. The top six finishers in the regular season of the conference's seven teams advance to the double-elimination tournament, which rotates among the home fields of each conference member. The winner of the tournament receives an automatic berth to the NCAA Division I Baseball Championship. The format has changed over the years between a six-team and four-team formats. Beginning in 2009, the conference allowed schools to host the championship on fields without lights.

== History ==
=== 1993–1994 ===
See, for example, 1994 North Atlantic Conference baseball tournament.

For the first two tournaments, the event was held over two weekends. On the first, the opening round consisted of best-of-three series, for which the league's eight members were paired. The winners of the four opening round series advanced to a double-elimination final round.

=== 1995–1997 ===
See, for example, 1997 America East Conference baseball tournament.

For these three tournaments, the event was held in a single weekend. Its format was the six-team double-elimination format of NCAA Regionals at the time.

=== 1998–2015 ===
See, for example, 2001 America East Conference baseball tournament.

For eighteen years, the format was a four-team double-elimination tournament. In some years, the event has been held at a campus location, while in others, it has been held at a neutral site.

=== 2016–present ===
The current format, adopted for the 2016 tournament, is six-team double-elimination event.

== Champions ==
=== By year ===
The following is a list of conference champions and sites listed by year.

Year	Champion	Runner-up	Venue
1993	Maine	Drexel	Delaware Diamond • Newark, DE
1994	Northeastern	Hartford	Friedman Diamond • Brookline, MA
1995	Delaware	Drexel	Frawley Stadium • Wilmington, DE
1996	Delaware	Drexel	Mahaney Diamond • Orono, ME
1997	Northeastern	Vermont	Frawley Stadium • Wilmington, DE
1998	Delaware	Northeastern	Frawley Stadium • Wilmington, DE
1999	Delaware	Towson	Frawley Stadium • Wilmington, DE
2000	Delaware	Northeastern	Frawley Stadium • Wilmington, DE
2001	Delaware	Towson	Frawley Stadium • Wilmington, DE
2002	Maine	Northeastern	Mahaney Diamond • Orono, ME
2003	Northeastern	Stony Brook	Centennial Field • Burlington, VT
2004	Stony Brook	Maine	Mahaney Diamond • Orono, ME
2005	Maine	Vermont	Centennial Field • Burlington, VT
2006	Maine	Stony Brook	Centennial Field • Burlington, VT
2007	Albany	Binghamton	Farmingdale State Baseball Stadium • Farmingdale, NY
2008	Stony Brook	Binghamton	Farmingdale State Baseball Stadium • Farmingdale, NY
2009	Binghamton	Albany	Pete Sylvester Field • Endicott, NY
2010	Stony Brook	Stony Brook	Varsity Field • Vestal, NY
2011	Maine	Albany	Joe Nathan Field • Stony Brook, NY
2012	Stony Brook	Maine	Joe Nathan Field • Stony Brook, NY
2013	Binghamton	Maine	Edward A. LeLacheur Park • Lowell, MA
2014	Binghamton	Stony Brook	Edward A. LeLacheur Park • Lowell, MA
2015	Stony Brook	UMBC	Edward A. LeLacheur Park • Lowell, MA
2016	Binghamton	Stony Brook	Edward A. LeLacheur Park • Lowell, MA
2017	UMBC	Maine	Edward A. LeLacheur Park • Lowell, MA
2018	Hartford	Stony Brook	Mahaney Diamond • Orono, ME
2019	Stony Brook	Binghamton	Varsity Field • Binghamton, NY
2020	Cancelled due to the coronavirus pandemic		
2021	NJIT (Tournament Not Completed)	Stony Brook	Joe Nathan Field • Stony Brook, NY
2022	Binghamton	UMass Lowell	Mahaney Diamond • Orono, ME
2023	Maine	Binghamton	Bearcat Sports Complex • Binghamton, NY
2024	Bryant	UMBC	Bearcat Sports Complex • Binghamton, NY
2025	Binghamton	Bryant	Mahaney Diamond • Orono, Maine
2026	Binghamton	Maine	Binghamton Baseball Complex • Binghamton, NY

== Championships by school ==
The following is a list of conference champions by school.

School	Championships	Years
Binghamton	7	2009, 2013, 2014, 2016, 2022, 2025, 2026
Delaware	6	1995, 1996, 1998, 1999, 2000, 2001
Maine	6	1993, 2002, 2005, 2006, 2011, 2023
Stony Brook	6	2004, 2008, 2010, 2012, 2015, 2019
Northeastern	3	1994, 1997, 2003
Albany	1	2007
Bryant	1	2024
Hartford	1	2018
UMBC	1	2017
NJIT	1	2021
Drexel	0	
UMass Lowell	0	

- Teams marked in pink denote a former member of the America East
