= Mike Gottlieb =

Biographical details
- Born: October 23, 1956 (age 70); Lynbrook, New York, U.S.

Playing career
- 1977–1978: Nassau Community College
- 1979–1980: Towson
- Position: First baseman

Coaching career (HC unless noted)
- 1981–1987: Towson (asst.)
- 1988–2017: Towson

Head coaching record
- Overall: 733–821–10

Mike Gottlieb (born October 23, 1956) is an American former college baseball coach, serving as head coach of the Towson Tigers baseball program from 1988 to 2017. He was named to that position prior to the start of the 1988 season.

== Playing career ==
Gottlieb played two seasons for Nassau Community College before transferring to Towson. He played first base for the Tigers and graduated in 1980.

== Coaching career ==
After his playing career ended, Gottlieb earned a position as an Assistant Coach with the Tigers. He served for seven seasons until head coach Billy Hunter was promoted to Athletic Director. Gottlieb was named head coach immediately. Since being named head coach, the Tigers have played in four conferences, winning a single regular season title and three conference tournament championships. Gottlieb has led Towson to three NCAA tournament appearance, won an America East Coach of the Year award, and placed two players in Major League Baseball.

During the 2013 NCAA Division I baseball season, Towson announced that they would discontinue baseball and soccer. The players reacted angrily by blacking out the Towson name on their jerseys and exploring transfer options. As the players rallied around their coach, fourth seeded Towson raced through the 2013 Colonial Athletic Association baseball tournament to claim the title, then earned a first round win in the NCAA tournament before finishing third in the Regional. Amid controversy and national attention, funding was secured to keep the baseball program through at least the 2015 season.

== Head coaching record ==
This table shows Gottlieb's record as a head coach at the Division I level.

Record table
Season	Team	Overall	Conference	Standing	Postseason
Towson (East Coast Conference) (1988–1992)
1988	Towson	30–17–1	12–2		NCAA Atlantic Regional
1989	Towson	23–21–1	9–4		ECC Tournament
1990	Towson	18–29	7–7		ECC Tournament
1991	Towson	28–23–1	9–4		NCAA Northeast Regional
1992	Towson	30–19–1	9–4		ECC tournament
Towson (ECC):		129–109–4	46–21		
Towson (Big South Conference) (1993–1995)
1993	Towson	20–25	14–9		Big South Tournament
1994	Towson	18–29	8–19		
1995	Towson	24–28–1	10–16		
Towson (Big South):		62–82–1	32–44		
Towson (America East Conference) (1996–2001)
1996	Towson	17–29	8–14	8th	
1997	Towson	24–28	9–14	6th	AEC tournament (Note: The top six finishers of the America East's nine teams qualified for the tournament in 1997.)
1998	Towson	21–27	9–18	7th	
1999	Towson	33–19	20–7	1st	AEC tournament (Note: The top four finishers of the America East's eight teams qualified for the tournament in 1999.)
2000	Towson	31–23–1	19–9	2nd	AEC tournament (Note: The top four finishers of the America East's eight teams qualified for the tournament in 2000.)
2001	Towson	37–23	17–11	3rd	AEC tournament (Note: The top four finishers of the America East's eight teams qualified for the tournament in 2001.)
Towson (AEC):		163–149–1	82–73		
Towson (Colonial Athletic Association) (2002–2017)
2002	Towson	23–27–1	9–12	3rd	
2003	Towson	28–25	11–9	3rd	CAA Tournament (Note: The top six finishers of the CAA's ten teams qualified for the tournament in 2003.)
2004	Towson	17–35	6–18	8th	
2005	Towson	34–24	13–11	4th	CAA Tournament (Note: The top six finishers of the CAA's nine teams qualified for the tournament in 2005.)
2006	Towson	20–34	8–22	11th	
2007	Towson	21–30	11–18	T-10th	
2008	Towson	30–28	14–16	6th	CAA Tournament (Note: The top six finishers of the CAA's eleven teams qualified for the tournament in 2008.)
2009	Towson	28–25	12–12	8th	CAA Tournament (Note: The top six finishers of the CAA's eleven teams qualified for the tournament in 2009.)
2010	Towson	19–36	11–13	7th	
2011	Towson	26–28–1	15–15	7th	
2012	Towson	27–31	15–15	6th	CAA tournament (Note: The top six finishers of the CAA's eleven teams qualified for the tournament in 2012.)
2013	Towson	30–30	14–13	6th	NCAA Regional
2014	Towson	22–25	4–13	8th	
2015	Towson	17–35–2	9–15–0	7th	
2016	Towson	20–25	10–14	T–7th	
2017	Towson	20–34	6–18	9th	
Towson:		382–472–4	168–234		
Total:		733–821–10			
National champion Postseason invitational champion Conference regular season champion Conference regular season and conference tournament champion Division regular season champion Division regular season and conference tournament champion Conference tournament champion

== See also ==
- List of current NCAA Division I baseball coaches
