= 1996 North Atlantic Conference baseball tournament =

American college baseball tournament

- Teams: 6
- Format: Double-elimination
- Finals site: Mahaney Diamond; Orono, ME
- Champions: Delaware (2nd title)
- Winning coach: Bob Hannah (2nd title)
- MVP: Adam Lamanteer (Delaware)

The 1996 North Atlantic Conference baseball tournament was held at Mahaney Diamond in Orono, Maine. The top six regular season finishers of the league's nine teams qualified for the double-elimination tournament. In the championship game, first-seeded Delaware defeated third-seeded Drexel, 12–2, to win its second tournament championship. As a result, Delaware received the North Atlantic's automatic bid to the 1996 NCAA tournament.

== Seeding ==
The top six finishers from the regular season were seeded one through six based on conference winning percentage only. They then played in a double-elimination format. In the first round, the one and six seeds were matched up in the first game, the two and five seeds in the second, and the three and four seeds in the third.

Team	W	L	Pct.	GB	Seed
Delaware	19	5	.792	–	1
Maine	12	8	.600	5	2
Drexel	12	8	.600	5	3
Hofstra	12	12	.500	7	4
Northeastern	11	11	.500	7	5
Hartford	10	14	.417	9	6
Vermont	8	12	.400	9	–
Towson State	8	14	.364	10	–
New Hampshire	8	16	.333	11	–

First round
1	Delaware	3
6	Hartford	1
2	Maine	4
5	Northeastern	0
3	Drexel	12
4	Hofstra	2

Second round
1	Delaware	27
4	Hofstra	2
2	Maine	2
3	Drexel	15
6	Hartford	8
5	Northeastern	7

Third round
1	Delaware	20
3	Drexel	10
2	Maine	6
6	Hartford	8

Semifinals
3	Drexel	10
6	Hartford	8

Final
1	Delaware	5	12
3	Drexel	13	2

== All-Tournament Team ==
The following players were named to the All-Tournament Team.

Player	Team
Brian August	Delaware
Dan Hammer	Delaware
Matt Ardizzone	Delaware
Adam Lamanteer	Delaware
Jason Gold	Drexel
Kris Doiron	Drexel
Kevin Fahy	Drexel
Brian Edge	Hartford
Dave Tober	Hartford
Keith Croteau	Maine
Pete Fischer	Maine

=== Most Outstanding Player ===
Delaware pitcher Adam Lamanteer was named Most Outstanding Player.

== Notes ==
- Delaware sets a tournament record for most runs (27).
