= 1998 America East Conference baseball tournament =

American college baseball tournament

- Teams: 4
- Format: Double-elimination
- Finals site: Frawley Stadium; Wilmington, DE
- Champions: Delaware (3rd title)
- Winning coach: Bob Hannah (3rd title)
- MVP: Chris Frey (Delaware)

The 1998 America East Conference baseball tournament was held at Frawley Stadium in Wilmington, Delaware. The top four regular season finishers of the league's eight teams qualified for the double-elimination tournament. In the championship game, first-seeded Delaware defeated second-seeded Northeastern, 10-4, to win its third tournament championship. As a result, Delaware received the America East's automatic bid to the 1998 NCAA tournament.

== Seeding ==
The top four finishers from the regular season were seeded one through four based on conference winning percentage only. They then played in a double-elimination format. In the first round, the one and four seeds were matched up in one game, while the two and three seeds were matched up in the other.

Team	W	L	Pct.	GB	Seed
Delaware	22	2	.917	–	1
Northeastern	17	9	.654	6	2
Vermont	15	12	.556	8.5	3
Hofstra	14	14	.500	10	4
Maine	12	16	.429	12	–
Drexel	9	15	.375	14	–
Towson	9	18	.333	15.5	–
Hartford	7	19	.269	17	–

== Results ==
Upper round 1
1	Delaware	8
4	Hofstra	0
2	Northeastern	10
3	Vermont	8
Lower round 1
4	Hofstra	6
3	Vermont	7 (Note: 10 innings.)

Upper final
1	Delaware	4
2	Northeastern	2
Lower final
2	Northeastern	12
3	Vermont	7

Final
1	Delaware
2	Northeastern

== All-Tournament Team ==
The following players were named to the All-Tournament Team.

Player	Team
Matt Phillips	Delaware
Chris Frey	Delaware
Matt Ardizzone	Delaware
Frank DiMaggio	Delaware
Brad Eyman	Delaware
Dan Trivits	Delaware
Carlos Peña	Northeastern
Kevin Kim	Northeastern
Hernan Guerrero	Northeastern
Wade Rikert	Vermont
Pat Friel	Hofstra

=== Most Outstanding Player ===
Delaware pitcher Chris Frey was named Most Outstanding Player.
