= 1997 America East Conference baseball tournament =

American college baseball tournament

- Teams: 6
- Format: Double-elimination
- Finals site: Frawley Stadium; Wilmington, DE
- Champions: Northeastern (2nd title)
- Winning coach: Neil McPhee (2nd title)
- MVP: Carlos Peña (Northeastern)

1997 America East Conference baseball standings
	Conf.				Overall
Team	W		L	PCT	W		L	PCT
Delaware ‍†‍‍	19	–	3	.864	45	–	10	.818
Maine ‍‍‍	16	–	8	.667	24	–	27	.471
Vermont ‍‍‍	15	–	9	.625	27	–	19	.587
Drexel ‍‍‍	13	–	10	.565	28	–	22	.560
Northeastern ‍‍‡‍^{y}	12	–	12	.500	33	–	19	.635
Towson State ‍‍‍	9	–	14	.391	24	–	28	.462
Hartford ‍‍‍	7	–	16	.304	16	–	23	.410
Hofstra ‍‍‍	7	–	16	.304	14	–	28	.333
New Hampshire ‍‍‍	7	–	17	.292	17	–	22	.436
† – Conference champion ‡ – Tournament champion y – Invited to the NCAA tournament As of June 30, 1997; Rankings from Collegiate Baseball

The 1997 America East Conference baseball tournament was held at Frawley Stadium in Wilmington, Delaware. The top six regular season finishers of the league's nine teams qualified for the double-elimination tournament. In the championship game, fifth-seeded Northeastern defeated third-seeded Vermont, 8–1, to win its second tournament championship. As a result, Northeastern received the America East's automatic bid to the 1997 NCAA tournament.

== Seeding ==
The top six finishers from the regular season were seeded one through six based on conference winning percentage only. They then played in a double-elimination format. In the first round, the one and six seeds were matched up in the first game, the two and five seeds in the second, and the three and four seeds in the third.

Team	W	L	Pct.	GB	Seed
Delaware	19	3	.864	–	1
Maine	16	8	.667	4	2
Vermont	15	9	.625	5	3
Drexel	13	10	.565	6.5	4
Northeastern	12	12	.500	8	5
Towson State	9	14	.391	10.5	6
Hartford	7	16	.304	12.5	–
Hofstra	7	16	.304	12.5	–
New Hampshire	7	17	.292	13	–

== Results ==
First round
1	Delaware	8
6	Towson State	4
2	Maine	2
5	Northeastern	6
3	Vermont	8
4	Drexel	2

Second round
1	Delaware	15
4	Drexel	3
5	Northeastern	12
3	Vermont	5
6	Towson State	7
2	Maine	6

Third round
1	Delaware	1
5	Northeastern	4
3	Vermont	4
6	Towson State	1

Semifinals
1	Delaware	3
3	Vermont	4

Final
5	Northeastern	8	—
3	Vermont	1	—

== All-Tournament Team ==
The following players were named to the All-Tournament Team.

Player	Team
Patrick Mason	Northeastern
Carlos Peña	Northeastern
Tim Daley	Northeastern
Tim Bonehill	Northeastern
Mike O'Donnell	Northeastern
Heath Squires	Vermont
Dana Forsberg	Vermont
Jerry Lynde	Vermont
Dan Colunio	Delaware
Brian August	Delaware
Craig Miller	Towson State

=== Most Outstanding Player ===
Northeastern first baseman Carlos Peña was named Most Outstanding Player.
