= 1995 North Atlantic Conference baseball tournament =

American college baseball tournament

- Teams: 6
- Format: Double-elimination
- Finals site: Frawley Stadium; Wilmington, DE
- Champions: Delaware (1st title)
- Winning coach: Bob Hannah (1st title)
- MVP: Kris Doiron (Drexel)

The 1995 North Atlantic Conference baseball tournament was held at Frawley Stadium in Wilmington, Delaware. The top six regular season finishers of the league's nine teams qualified for the double-elimination tournament. In the championship game, first-seeded Delaware defeated fifth-seeded Drexel, 12-2, to win its first tournament championship. As a result, Delaware received the North Atlantic's automatic bid to the 1995 NCAA tournament play-in round.

== Seeding ==
The top six finishers from the regular season were seeded one through six based on conference winning percentage only. They then played in a double-elimination format. In the first round, the one and six seeds were matched up in the first game, the two and five seeds in the second, and the three and four seeds in the third.

Team	W	L	Pct.	GB	Seed
Delaware	19	3	.864	–	1
Northeastern	16	8	.667	4	2
Vermont	15	9	.625	5	3
New Hampshire	14	10	.583	6	4
Drexel	11	12	.478	8.5	5
Maine	11	13	.458	9	6
Hartford	10	12	.455	9	–
Hofstra	8	15	11.5	10	–
Boston University	1	23	.042	19	–

== Results ==
First round
1	Delaware	14
6	Maine	6
2	Northeastern	3
5	Drexel	9
3	Vermont	6
4	New Hampshire	9^{10}

Second round
1	Delaware	3
3	Vermont	6
1	Delaware	11
4	New Hampshire	5
5	Drexel	10
4	New Hampshire	2
6	Maine	7
2	Northeastern	19

Third round
3	Vermont	2
2	Northeastern	9
5	Drexel	7
1	Delaware	13

Semifinals
2	Northeastern	2
5	Drexel	9

Final
5	Drexel	6
1	Delaware	16

== All-Tournament Team ==
The following players were named to the All-Tournament Team.

Player	Team
Brian August	Delaware
Cliff Brumbaugh	Delaware
Andre Duffie	Delaware
Dan Hammer	Delaware
Ethan Jack	Delaware
Curt Schnur	Delaware
Kris Doiron	Drexel
Derek Gauthier	Northeastern
Mike O'Donnell	Northeastern
Dalyn Drown	Vermont
Anthony Valentine	New Hampshire

=== Most Outstanding Player ===
Drexel pitcher and infielder Kris Doiron was named Most Outstanding Player.
