= 2001 America East Conference baseball tournament =

American college baseball tournament

- Teams: 4
- Format: Double-elimination
- Finals site: Frawley Stadium; Wilmington, DE
- Champions: Delaware (6th title)
- Winning coach: Jim Sherman (1st title)
- MVP: Gregg Davies (Towson)

The 2001 America East Conference baseball tournament was held from May 17 through 19 at Frawley Stadium in Wilmington, Delaware. The top four regular season finishers of the league's eight teams qualified for the double-elimination tournament. In the championship game, first-seeded Delaware defeated third-seeded Towson, 7–0, to win its fourth consecutive and sixth overall tournament championship. As a result, Delaware received the America East's automatic bid to the 2001 NCAA tournament.

== Seeding ==
The top four finishers from the regular season were seeded one through four based on conference winning percentage only. They then played in a double-elimination format. In the first round, the one and four seeds were matched up in one game, while the two and three seeds were matched up in the other.

Team	W	L	Pct.	GB	Seed
Delaware	22	6	.786	–	1
Maine	20	8	.714	2	2
Towson	17	11	.607	5	3
Northeastern	11	17	.393	11	4
Drexel	11	17	.393	11	–
Vermont	10	17	.371	11.5	–
Hofstra	10	17	.371	11.5	–
Hartford	10	18	.357	12	–

== Results ==
Upper round 1
1	Delaware	7
4	Northeastern	3
2	Maine	4
3	Towson	20
Lower round 1
4	Northeastern	5
2	Maine	4

Upper final
1	Delaware	4
3	Towson	1
Lower final
3	Towson	7
4	Northeastern	6

Final
1	Delaware
3	Towson

== All-Tournament Team ==
The following players were named to the All-Tournament Team.

Player	Team
Vic Sage	Delaware
Jason Vincent	Delaware
Steve Harden	Delaware
Andrew Salvo	Delaware
Reid Gorecki	Delaware
Vince Vukovich	Delaware
Scott Bacon	Towson
Brian McKenna	Towson
Gregg Davies	Towson
Jimmy Kittleberger	Towson
Luke Carlin	Northeastern

=== Most Outstanding Player ===
Towson outfielder Gregg Davies was named Most Outstanding Player.
