= 1999 America East Conference baseball tournament =

American college baseball tournament

- Teams: 4
- Format: Double-elimination
- Finals site: Frawley Stadium; Wilmington, DE
- Champions: Delaware (4th title)
- Winning coach: Bob Hannah (4th title)
- MVP: Bryan Porcelli (Delaware)

The 1999 America East Conference baseball tournament was held from May 21 through 23 at Frawley Stadium in Wilmington, Delaware. The top four regular season finishers of the league's eight teams qualified for the double-elimination tournament. In the championship game, second-seeded Delaware defeated first-seeded Towson, 6-3, to win its second consecutive and fourth overall tournament championship. As a result, Delaware received the America East's automatic bid to the 1999 NCAA tournament.

== Seeding ==
The top four finishers from the regular season were seeded one through four based on conference winning percentage only. They then played in a double-elimination format. In the first round, the one and four seeds were matched up in one game, while the two and three seeds were matched up in the other.

Team	W	L	Pct.	GB	Seed
Towson	20	7	.741	–	1
Delaware	19	9	.679	1.5	2
Northeastern	18	10	.643	2.5	3
Maine	14	14	.500	6.5	4
Hofstra	14	14	.500	6.5	–
Vermont	10	18	.357	10.5	–
Drexel	9	19	.321	11.5	–
Hartford	7	20	.259	13	–

== Results ==
Upper round 1
1	Towson	6
4	Maine	1
2	Delaware	7
3	Northeastern	3
Lower round 1
4	Maine	7
3	Northeastern	5

Upper final
1	Towson	4
2	Delaware	1
Lower final
2	Delaware	5
4	Maine	3

Final
2	Towson
1	Delaware

== All-Tournament Team ==
The following players were named to the All-Tournament Team.

Player	Team
Bryan Porcelli	Delaware
Andrew Salvo	Delaware
Kevin Mench	Delaware
Chris Russ	Towson
Dusty Reynolds	Towson
Tim Pritchard	Towson
Jason Sandner	Towson
Mike Ross	Maine
Quin Peel	Maine
Matt Keating	Northeastern
Kevin Kim	Northeastern

=== Most Outstanding Player ===
Delaware pitcher Bryan Porcelli was named Most Outstanding Player.
