= 1994 North Atlantic Conference baseball tournament =

American college baseball tournament

- Teams: 8
- Format: Best-of-three quarterfinals Double-elimination final round
- Finals site: Friedman Diamond; Brookline, MA
- Champions: Northeastern (1st title)
- Winning coach: Neil McPhee (1st title)
- MVP: Bill Barrale (Northeastern)

The 1994 North Atlantic Conference baseball tournament was held over two weekends, with the final round being played at Friedman Diamond in Brookline, Massachusetts. All eight of the league's teams qualified for the tournament, the format of which was best-of-three quarterfinals and a four-team double-elimination final round. In the championship game, second-seeded Northeastern defeated fifth-seeded Hartford, 5-0, to win its first tournament championship. As a result, Northeastern received the North Atlantic's automatic bid to the 1994 NCAA tournament.

== Seeding ==
All eight of the league's teams were seeded one through eight based on conference winning percentage only. They were then matched up for an opening round of four best-of-three series– one vs. eight, two vs. seven, three vs. six, and four vs. five. The four winners of these series met in a double-elimination final round.

Team	W	L	Pct.	GB	Seed
Delaware	20	4	.833	–	1
Northeastern	18	6	.750	2	2
Drexel	13	7	.650	5	3
Maine	13	12	.520	7.5	4
Hartford	10	11	.476	9.5	5
Vermont	10	13	.435	10.5	6
New Hampshire	6	17	.261	14.5	7
Boston University	4	24	.143	19	8

== Results ==
Quarterfinals
1	Delaware	8	7	—
8	Boston University	2	3	—
4	Maine	1	8	—
5	Hartford	5	10	—
2	Northeastern	8	3	—
7	New Hampshire	1	1	—
3	Drexel	12	1	9
6	Vermont	4	6	6

Quarter-finals
1	Delaware	1
5	Hartford	5
2	Northeastern	9
3	Drexel	2
1	Delaware	14
3	Drexel	8

Semi-finals
5	Hartford	6
2	Northeastern	5
2	Northeastern	4
1	Delaware	3

Final
5	Hartford	5	0
2	Northeastern	6	5

== All-Tournament Team ==
The following players were named to the All-Tournament Team.

Player	Team
Bill Barrale	Northeastern
Derek Gauthier	Northeastern
Mike Glavine	Northeastern
Mark Hopkins	Northeastern
Tim O'Connell	Northeastern
Jay O'Shaughnessy	Northeastern
Scott LaRock	Hartford
Dave Tober	Hartford
Deron Brown	Delaware
Ethan Jack	Delaware
Tom Lafferty	Delaware
John Shannon	Drexel

=== Most Outstanding Player ===
Northeastern outfielder Bill Barrale was named Most Outstanding Player.
