= 2000 America East Conference baseball tournament =

American college baseball tournament

- Teams: 4
- Format: Double-elimination
- Finals site: Frawley Stadium; Wilmington, DE
- Champions: Delaware (5th title)
- Winning coach: Bob Hannah (5th title)
- MVP: Vince Vukovich (Delaware)

The 2000 America East Conference baseball tournament was held from May 18 through 20 at Frawley Stadium in Wilmington, Delaware. The top four regular season finishers of the league's eight teams qualified for the double-elimination tournament. In the championship game, first-seeded Delaware defeated fourth-seeded Northeastern, 4-2, to win its third consecutive and fifth overall tournament championship. As a result, Delaware received the America East's automatic bid to the 2000 NCAA tournament.

== Seeding ==
The top four finishers from the regular season were seeded one through four based on conference winning percentage only. They then played in a double-elimination format. In the first round, the one and four seeds were matched up in one game, while the two and three seeds were matched up in the other.

Team	W	L	Pct.	GB	Seed
Delaware	19	5	.792	–	1
Towson	19	9	.679	2	2
Vermont	16	10	.615	4	3
Northeastern	15	11	.577	5	4
Maine	14	12	.538	6	–
Hofstra	9	17	.346	11	–
Drexel	8	20	.286	13	–
Hartford	6	22	.214	15	–

== Results ==
Upper round 1
1	Delaware	4 (Note: 12 innings.)
4	Northeastern	3
2	Towson	7
3	Vermont	8
Lower round 1
4	Northeastern	7
2	Towson	5

Upper final
1	Delaware	7
3	Vermont	2
Lower final
3	Vermont	2
4	Northeastern	7

Final
1	Delaware
4	Northeastern

== All-Tournament Team ==
The following players were named to the All-Tournament Team.

Player	Team
Vic Sage	Delaware
Jason Vincent	Delaware
John Schneider	Delaware
Andrew Salvo	Delaware
Kris Dufner	Delaware
Chris Kolodzey	Delaware
Chris Walsh	Northeastern
Matt Keating	Northeastern
Todd Korchin	Northeastern
Wade Rikert	Vermont
Jason Sandner	Towson

=== Most Outstanding Player ===
Delaware outfielder Vince Vukovich was named Most Outstanding Player.
