= Jeff Schulman =

UVM Athletic Director

Current position
- Title: Athletic Director
- Team: Vermont
- Conference: America East Conference

Biographical details
- Born: February 15, 1967 (age 59); Buffalo, New York, U.S.
- Education: University of Vermont (BA, MEd)

Playing career
- 1985–1989: Vermont
- Position: Defense

Administrative career (AD unless noted)
- 1990–1993: Bates College (asst. AD)
- 1993–2002: Vermont (asst. AD)
- 2002–2016: Vermont (sr. assoc. AD)
- 2016–present: Vermont

Accomplishments and honors

Awards
- 2000 ECAC Administrator of the Year

Jeff Schulman (born February 15, 1967) is an American collegiate athletics administrator and former college ice hockey defenseman currently serving as the Director of Athletics at the University of Vermont. Schulman assumed the role on July 1, 2016, succeeding Robert Corran, and became the ninth athletic director in the modern era of UVM athletics and only the fourth since 1973.

== Early life and education ==
Schulman grew up in Buffalo, New York. He attended the University of Vermont, where he earned both undergraduate and graduate degrees.

== Playing career ==
As an undergraduate, Schulman was a defenseman on UVM's men's ice hockey team from 1985 to 1989. He helped the team reach its first NCAA Men’s Ice Hockey Tournament in 1988 and notably assisted a goal that led to an upset victory over Harvard in the ECAC semifinals in 1989. He was selected by the Boston Bruins in the 1989 NHL supplemental draft. He declined the Bruins' invitation to training camp, and instead took a one year internship with the ECAC.

== Administrative career ==
=== Early administrative roles ===
Schulman's administrative career began with an Asa S. Bushnell Internship at the Eastern College Athletic Conference (ECAC). From 1990 to 1993, he served as assistant athletic director at Bates College. Schulman returned to UVM in 1993, initially serving as assistant director of athletics and later promoted to senior associate athletic director in 2002. During this time, he oversaw financial operations, budgeting, capital projects, and was involved in major facility improvements, including the construction of Moulton Winder Field, the Frank H. Livak Track & Field Facility, and Virtue Field. He also managed athletic fundraising and development and was the sport administrator for field hockey and women's ice hockey.

Schulman served on several NCAA committees, including the Division I Women’s Soccer Committee and the National Collegiate Women’s Ice Hockey Committee, chairing the latter. Additionally, he participated internationally as part of the staff for the 1996 and 2000 Summer Olympic Games, and led the U.S. delegation at the 2009 Maccabiah Games in Israel.

=== Athletic Director at UVM ===
In April 2016, Schulman was named Director of Athletics at the University of Vermont. He reorganized the athletics department to report directly to the university president, reflecting the increased prominence of athletics within the university's administrative structure.

A significant initiative under Schulman's leadership is the Multi-Purpose Center project, including the new Tarrant Event Center and major renovations to Gutterson Fieldhouse. The project, funded through substantial private donations, represents the largest capital fundraising effort in UVM's history.

During his tenure, UVM athletics has seen notable successes, particularly in men's basketball, which achieved an undefeated America East Conference record in the 2016–17 season and secured multiple conference championships. In December 2024, the men's soccer team secured the NCAA Division I national championship by defeating Marshall University 2–1 in overtime, the school's first national championship in a traditional team sport. Other successes include men's soccer winning the America East Championship in 2021, and the university hosting the 2019 NCAA Skiing Championships.

In 2020, Schulman was appointed to the NCAA Division I Men’s Ice Hockey Committee, continuing his active involvement in collegiate sports governance.

== Personal life ==
Schulman resides in Burlington, Vermont, with his wife, Deb Lichtenfeld, and their three children. He is active in the Burlington community, serving on the Burlington Airport Commission and the Burlington Business Association board.
