= Mike Glavine =

American baseball player (born 1973)

Northeastern Huskies
- First baseman
- Born: January 24, 1973 (age 53); Concord, Massachusetts, U.S.
- Batted: Left Threw: Left

MLB debut
- September 14, 2003, for the New York Mets

Last MLB appearance
- September 28, 2003, for the New York Mets

MLB statistics
- Batting average: .143
- Hit: 1
- Stats at Baseball Reference

Teams
- New York Mets (2003)

Career highlights and awards
- CAA Coach of the Year (2025)

Michael Patrick Glavine (born January 24, 1973) is an American baseball coach and former first baseman who played in Major League Baseball (MLB) for the New York Mets in 2003. He is the current head baseball coach of the Northeastern Huskies, and is the brother of Baseball Hall of Famer Tom Glavine.

== Playing career ==
=== Amateur ===
Glavine is a graduate of Northeastern University where he played college baseball for the Huskies under coach Neil McPhee from 1992 to 1995. He was named to the All-Tournament Team at the 1994 NAC tournament. After the 1994 season, he played collegiate summer baseball with the Hyannis Mets of the Cape Cod Baseball League and was named a league all-star. Glavine became the fourth Husky to play in Major League Baseball, and was elected to the Northeastern Athletics Hall of Fame in 2006.

=== Professional ===
He was selected by the Cleveland Indians in the 22nd round of the 1995 MLB draft. Glavine was called up to the Mets on September 12, 2003, joining his brother on the team. He played in six games and had one hit in seven at bats for the 2003 Mets. As of the 2026 season, Mike and Tom are the only set of brothers to play for the Mets.

== Coaching career ==
Glavine returned to Northeastern as an assistant coach in 2007, and succeeded Neil McPhee as head coach after the 2014 season.

== Head coaching record ==
Record table
Season	Team	Overall	Conference	Standing	Postseason
Northeastern (Colonial Athletic Association) (2015–present)
2015	Northeastern	25–30	14–10	3rd	CAA tournament
2016	Northeastern	31–27	12–11	5th	CAA tournament
2017	Northeastern	29–25	16–7	1st	CAA tournament
2018	Northeastern	36–21	17–6	1st	NCAA Regional
2019	Northeastern	28–29	12–12	T-3rd	CAA tournament
2020	Northeastern	10–5	0–0		Season canceled due to COVID-19
2021	Northeastern	36–12	20–3	1st (North)	NCAA Regional
2022	Northeastern	31–29–1	10–14	6th	CAA tournament
2023	Northeastern	44–16	20–10	T-2nd	NCAA Regional
2024	Northeastern	38–17	18–9	3rd	CAA tournament
2025	Northeastern	49–11	25–2	1st	NCAA Regional
2026	Northeastern	39–22	22–8	1st (North)	NCAA Regional
Northeastern:		396–242–1 (.621)	186–92–0 (.669)		
Total:		396–242–1 (.621)			
National champion Postseason invitational champion Conference regular season champion Conference regular season and conference tournament champion Division regular season champion Division regular season and conference tournament champion Conference tournament champion
