= Tom Glavine =

American baseball pitcher (born 1966)

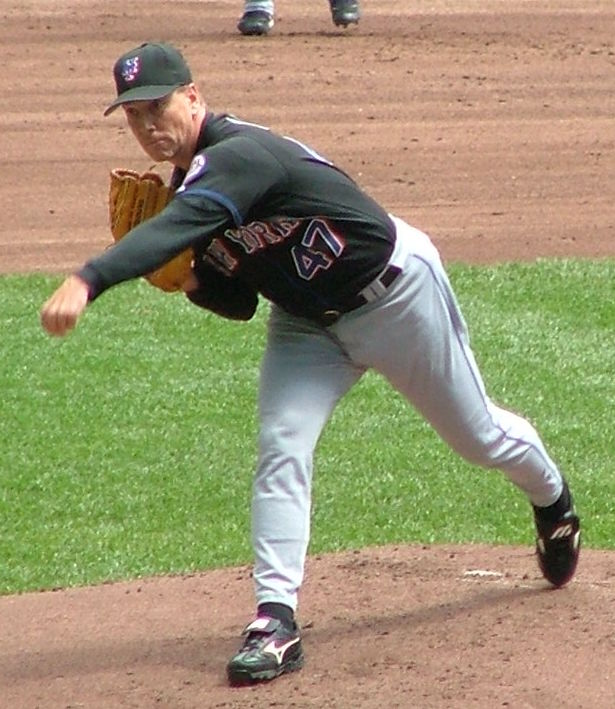
- Glavine with the New York Mets in 2005
- Pitcher
- Born: March 25, 1966 (age 60); Concord, Massachusetts, U.S.
- Batted: Left Threw: Left

MLB debut
- August 17, 1987, for the Atlanta Braves

Last MLB appearance
- August 14, 2008, for the Atlanta Braves

MLB statistics
- Win–loss record: 305–203
- Earned run average: 3.54
- Strikeouts: 2,607
- Stats at Baseball Reference

Teams
- Atlanta Braves (1987–2002); New York Mets (2003–2007); Atlanta Braves (2008)

Career highlights and awards
- 10× All-Star (1991–1993, 1996–1998, 2000, 2002, 2004, 2006); World Series champion (1995); 2× NL Cy Young Award (1991, 1998); World Series MVP (1995); 4× Silver Slugger Award (1991, 1995, 1996, 1998); 5× NL wins leader (1991–1993, 1998, 2000); Atlanta Braves No. 47 retired; Braves Hall of Fame

Member of the National

Baseball Hall of Fame
- Induction: 2014
- Vote: 91.9% (first ballot)

Thomas Michael Glavine (/ˈɡlævɪn/ GLA-vin; born March 25, 1966) is an American former professional baseball pitcher who played 22 seasons in Major League Baseball (MLB), for the Atlanta Braves (1987–2002, 2008) and New York Mets (2003–2007).

With 164 victories during the 1990s, Glavine earned the second-highest number of wins as a pitcher in the National League (NL), second only to teammate Greg Maddux's 176. He was a five-time 20-game winner and two-time Cy Young Award winner, and one of only 24 pitchers (and just six left-handers) in major league history to earn 300 career wins. He was the Most Valuable Player of the 1995 World Series as the Braves beat the Cleveland Indians.

In 2014, Glavine was elected to the Baseball Hall of Fame in his first year of eligibility, receiving 91.9% of the votes cast.

== Early years ==
Glavine was born in Concord, Massachusetts, and raised in Billerica, Massachusetts. Glavine attended Billerica Memorial High School, where he was an excellent student and a letterman in ice hockey as well as baseball. He was a four-year member of the honor roll and the National Honor Society. In hockey, he scored 47 goals and 47 assists in 23 high school games, and as a senior, he was named the Merrimack Valley's Most Valuable Player. In baseball, he led his team to the Division I North Title and the Eastern Massachusetts Championship as a senior. He graduated from high school in 1984 with honors. Glavine was elected to the Billerica Memorial/Howe High School Athletic Hall of Fame in 1993.

== Professional career ==
=== Drafts and minor leagues ===
Glavine was drafted by both the Los Angeles Kings of the National Hockey League (NHL) in the 1984 NHL entry draft in the fourth round, 69th overall—two rounds ahead of Brett Hull and five ahead of Luc Robitaille, both future Hockey Hall of Fame inductees—and by the Atlanta Braves in the second round of the 1984 MLB draft. Glavine elected to play baseball and signed on with the Braves.

=== Atlanta Braves (1987–2002) ===
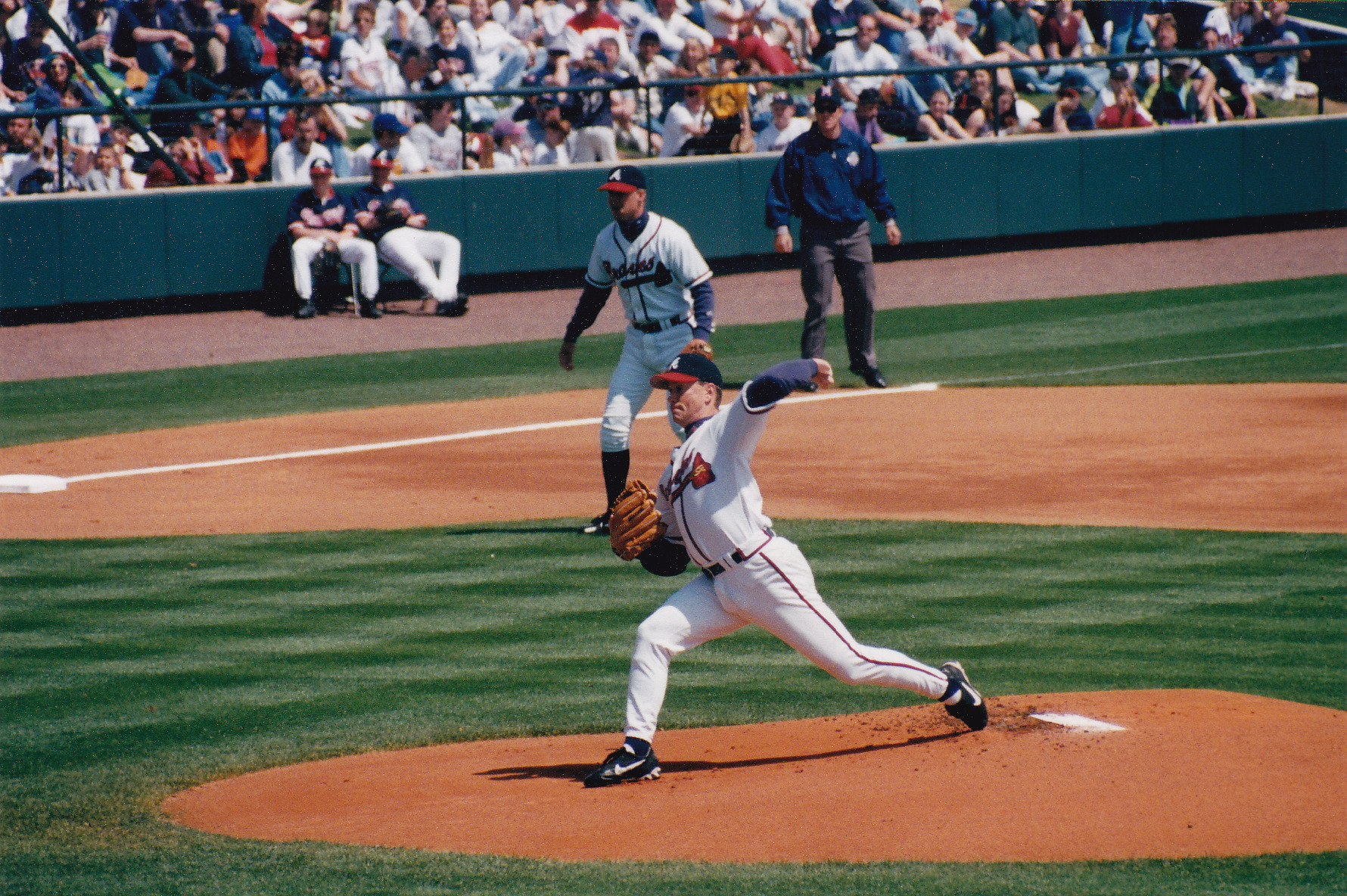
Glavine delivers a pitch in spring training, 1998

Glavine made his major league debut on August 17, 1987. Glavine had mixed results during his first four seasons in the Majors, compiling a 33–43 record from 1987 to 1990, including a 17-loss performance in 1988. His fortunes turned around in 1991, when he won 20 games and posted a 2.55 earned run average. It was his first of three consecutive seasons with 20 or more wins, and saw him earn his first National League Cy Young Award. Glavine was the ace of the 1991 Braves' starting rotation that included Steve Avery, Charlie Leibrandt, and another future NL Cy Young Award winner and Hall of Fame inductee, John Smoltz. His season helped ensure a dramatic reversal in the Braves' competitive fortunes as they won the National League pennant and earned a trip to the World Series, though they lost to the Minnesota Twins in seven games. In an era of the diminishing 20-game winner (there were none in the majors in 2006 and 2009), Glavine became the last major league pitcher to win 20 games in three straight years (1991–1993).

Atlanta, long thought of as a perennial cellar dweller, was lifted in the 1990s into one of the most successful franchises in the game on the strength of its stellar pitching staff and solid hitting. After the Braves signed free-agent Greg Maddux from the Chicago Cubs in 1993, Glavine, Maddux, and Smoltz formed one of the best pitching rotations in baseball history. Among them, they won seven Cy Young Awards during the period of 1991 to 1998. Glavine won his second Cy Young Award in 1998, going 20–6 with a 2.47 ERA. Years later, after Glavine joined the Mets and Maddux played for the San Diego Padres, the three (along with Smoltz who still pitched for Atlanta) all recorded wins on the same day, June 27, 2007. The Braves defeated the Cleveland Indians in six games in the 1995 World Series, and Glavine was named the Series MVP. He won two games during that series: Game 2 and Game 6. In Game 6, he pitched eight innings of one-hit shutout baseball.

In addition to the championship won with the Braves in 1995, he pitched in four other World Series with the team (in 1991, 1992, 1996, and 1999) when the Braves lost to the Minnesota Twins, Toronto Blue Jays, and New York Yankees twice, respectively.

=== New York Mets (2003–2007) ===
In 2003, Glavine left Atlanta to play for the rival New York Mets, signing a four-year, $42.5 million deal. Glavine's performance had slumped in the second half of 2002 and he was ineffective in his two postseason starts, so Atlanta refused to guarantee a third year on his contract. Glavine struggled in his first year as a Met. For the first time since 1988, he failed to win 10 games, also posting his first losing record in that span, 9–14. He also allowed his first career grand slam, hit by José Vidro of the Expos on September 19. Glavine did get to enjoy a personal highlight at the end of the season, however, when the Mets called up his brother Mike to join the team.

Glavine began 2004 well, highlighted by a May 23 one-hit shutout of the Colorado Rockies and selection to the National League All-Star team. However, he struggled again during a second half marred by losing front teeth in a car accident while riding in a taxicab. He went on to post a slightly better record, though still a losing one, going 11–14. He started off 2005 slowly, but rebounded after advice from pitching coach Rick Peterson, who encouraged Glavine to begin pitching inside more often (including a change-up in) and incorporate a curveball in his repertoire. Glavine's turnaround helped him earn National League Pitcher of the Month in September. He finished the season with a 13–13 record and a respectable 3.53 ERA.

The Mets' faith in Glavine was rewarded when he returned to his old form during the 2006 season. He finished one victory shy of the NL lead in wins and was selected to the All-Star team. That season Tom Glavine became the first Mets left-hander in nearly 30 years to start at least thirty games in four consecutive seasons. Glavine and the Mets got a scare in August 2006. His pitching shoulder was tested for a blood clot because he was suffering from coldness in his left ring finger. This was originally thought to be a symptom of Raynaud's syndrome, which had been diagnosed in 1990. According to the pitcher, "Doctors... picked something up when they did the ultrasound." The results of that new test showed the problem could be treated with medicine, and Glavine resumed pitching on September 1, against the Houston Astros.

Glavine finished the 2006 season with a fine 15–7 record and a 3.82 ERA, as the Mets won the National League Eastern Division, allowing him to make his first playoff appearance since leaving the Braves. He started Game 2 of the Division Series against the Los Angeles Dodgers, pitching six shutout innings and surrendering only four hits to pick up the win, as the Mets went on to sweep the series from the Dodgers. He then started Game 1 of the National League Championship Series against the St. Louis Cardinals, pitching seven shutout innings to pick up the win, helped by Carlos Beltrán's two-run home run. Glavine's postseason scoreless innings streak ended in his next start. He suffered the loss in Game 5 while the Mets went on to drop the series to the Cardinals in seven games.

Glavine re-signed with the Mets for the 2007 season, needing only 10 wins to reach 300 wins for his career. He started his fourth Opening Day game as a Met in the 2007 season.

On August 5, 2007, Glavine won his 300th game, against the Chicago Cubs at Wrigley Field on ESPN's Sunday Night Baseball. In the game, he also was 1 for 2 with a run batted in and a walk. He pitched 6 1/3 innings and won 8–3, bringing his lifetime record to 300–197. Glavine is the 23rd pitcher to win 300 games, and the fifth left-handed pitcher to do so, joining Eddie Plank, Lefty Grove, Warren Spahn, and Steve Carlton. (Randy Johnson won his 300th game on June 4, 2009, becoming the 24th pitcher and 6th left-hander to do so.)

On September 30, 2007, Glavine started the final game of the Mets' 2007 regular season against the Florida Marlins. The Mets, tied with the Philadelphia Phillies after having squandered a seven-game lead over the prior sixteen games, needed a win to either win the division or force a playoff game with the Phillies for the division. Glavine made one of the worst starts of his career, allowing seven runs while recording only one out, and the Mets were eliminated from playoff contention with an 8–1 loss.

Glavine declined a one-year, $13 million contract option for the 2008 season with the Mets on October 5, 2007, ending his tenure with the team. However, he did collect a $3 million buyout when he declined the $13 million option.

=== Return to Atlanta Braves (2008) and retirement ===
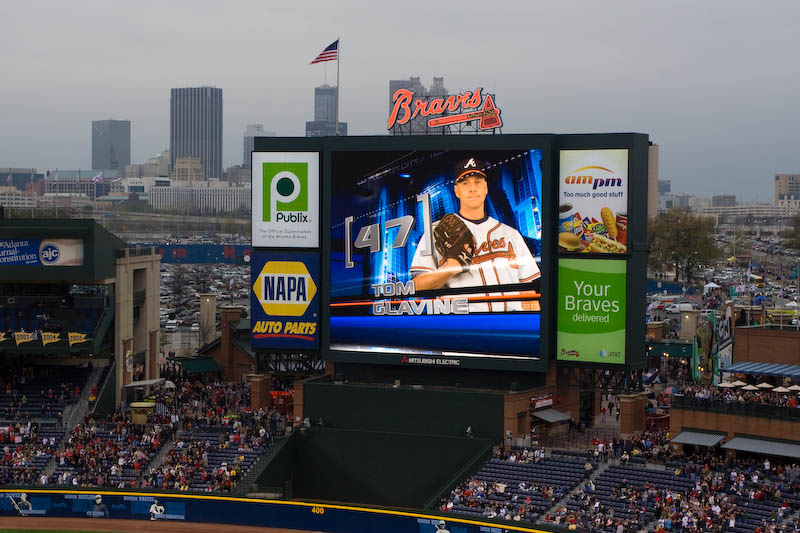
Glavine being introduced at Turner Field in his first game back with the Braves in 2008

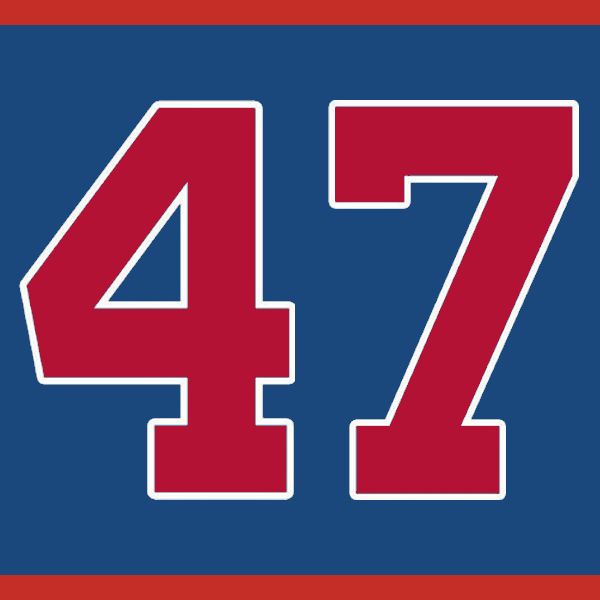
Tom Glavine's number 47 was retired by the Atlanta Braves in 2010.

On November 18, 2007, Glavine rejoined the Braves, seemingly bringing his career full circle, with a one-year contract worth $8 million. On April 18, 2008, Glavine was placed on the disabled list (DL) for the first time in his 22-year career.

On May 14, 2008, Glavine won his first game with the Atlanta Braves since September 19, 2002. This was also his 304th win, and it occurred against the Philadelphia Phillies, as had the prior one 5 1/2 years earlier.

On August 14, 2008, Glavine appeared in his final game. He started against the Chicago Cubs, and he gave up seven runs in four innings. A few days later, he was placed on the disabled list because of a recurring shoulder injury.

On February 19, 2009, Glavine agreed to return to Atlanta on a $1 million, one-year contract that included another $3.5 million in possible bonuses based on roster time. However, the Braves released Glavine on June 3, as he was completing his rehab assignment. On June 20, Glavine announced he would not pitch for the rest of the season.

On February 11, 2010, Glavine officially retired as a player, having strongly hinted at that decision throughout the prior few months. That day, he agreed to take a job as a special assistant to Braves president John Schuerholz. He was a guest analyst for some Braves games for several seasons. Following the death of his father in 2021, Glavine announced that he would be taking a break from broadcasting during the 2022 season. He returned to the broadcast booth in a part-time role in 2023.

The Braves retired Glavine's #47 on August 6, 2010.

On July 29, 2021, Glavine was elected to the Baseball Hall of Fame's Board of Directors.

== Pitching style ==
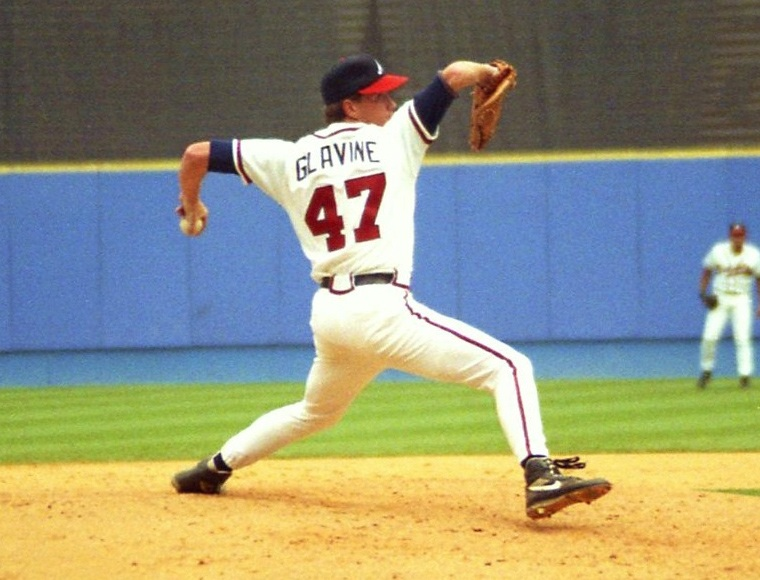
Glavine with the Atlanta Braves in 1993.

Glavine, a left-hander, gradually lost velocity over the latter part of his career. Even at the end of his career, he was an effective starting pitcher in the National League due to his excellent control and deception, changing speeds, and locating pitches off the outside corner of the strike zone. His most common approach was to begin by locating his circle changeup off the outside corner, then follow with alternating fastballs and changeups to confuse the hitter. While batters frequently made contact with his pitches, the substantial movement he placed on them made drives very soft, resulting in easily fielded ground balls and fly outs. Glavine's consistency was also highlighted by his durability; beginning with his first full year, in 1988, he started at least 25 games every season and was never placed on the disabled list until his final season—at age 42. In addition to his excellent changeup and well-controlled fastball, Glavine had a plus-curve ball, a slider, and a tailing two-seam fastball. Despite being a left-handed pitcher, Glavine was often more effective against right-handed batters. Dodgers broadcaster Vin Scully noted that this attribute was likely due to Glavine pitching from the extreme right edge of the pitching rubber.

Like longtime Atlanta teammates Greg Maddux and John Smoltz, Glavine was one of the better-hitting pitchers of his generation. He had a career .186 batting average—decent for a modern pitcher—and hit over .200 in nine seasons, with a career-best of .289 in 1996. He had a good eye, drawing a high number of walks (for a pitcher), which, combined with his hits, gave him a career on-base percentage of .244. Because Glavine got on base almost a quarter of the time he came at bat, opposing pitchers were never able to treat him as an automatic out in the lineup. In 2004, Glavine walked as often as he struck out (10 times each). Glavine's 201 sacrifice bunts prior to 2007 ranked second among active players at the time, only behind Omar Vizquel. Glavine won four Silver Slugger Awards, ranking him second all-time for pitchers behind Mike Hampton, while being the most among Cy Young Award Winners and Hall of Famer pitchers.

== Players' union representative ==
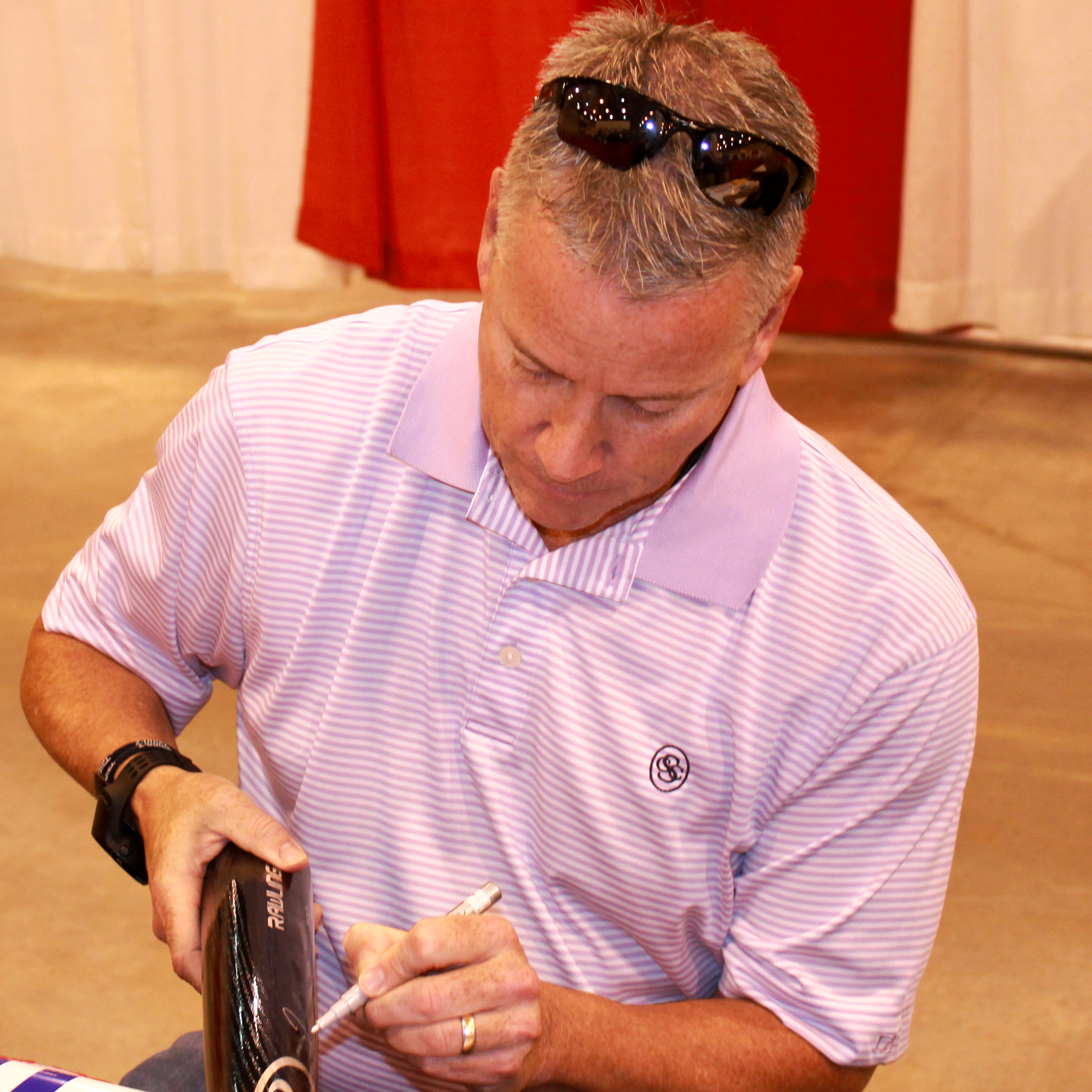
Glavine signs autographs in 2014

Starting in 1991, Tom Glavine served as the Atlanta Braves team representative to the Major League Baseball Players Association, succeeding former NL Most Valuable Player and Braves icon Dale Murphy in the position. Prior to and during the 1994–95 MLB strike, Glavine was heavily involved in negotiations between the union and team owners and was frequently interviewed and quoted in the press about the talks. Ultimately, the strike caused the cancellation of the 1994 World Series and lasted 7 1/2 months. When play resumed in 1995, Glavine was booed by Braves fans for his role in the players' union.

== Personal life ==
Glavine and his wife Christine married in 1998 and have a family of five children. One of their sons, Peyton, became a professional baseball player. They live in Johns Creek, Georgia, and Glavine coaches his sons' hockey teams. Glavine is a Roman Catholic and is a member of Catholic Athletes for Christ.

Glavine's younger brother, Mike, also played in MLB as a first baseman for the New York Mets in 2003, late in the same year in which Tom Glavine signed with the Mets in free agency.

== See also ==
- List of Major League Baseball career wins leaders
- List of Major League Baseball annual wins leaders
- List of Major League Baseball career strikeout leaders
- Major League Baseball titles leaders
