= 2004 America East Conference baseball tournament =

American college baseball tournament

- Teams: 4
- Format: Double-elimination
- Finals site: Mahaney Diamond; Orono, ME
- Champions: Stony Brook (1st title)
- Winning coach: Matt Senk (1st title)
- MVP: Isidro Fortuna (Stony Brook)

The 2004 America East Conference baseball tournament took place from May 27 through 29 at Mahaney Diamond in Orono, Maine. The top four regular season finishers of the league's eight teams qualified for the double-elimination tournament. In the championship game, fourth-seeded Stony Brook defeated second-seeded Maine, 3–1, to win its first tournament championship. As a result, Stony Brook received the America East's automatic bid to the 2004 NCAA tournament, the program's first in Division I.

== Seeding ==
The top four finishers from the regular season were seeded one through four based on conference winning percentage only. They then played in a double-elimination format. In the first round, the one and four seeds were matched up in one game, while the two and three seeds were matched up in the other.

Team	W	L	Pct.	GB	Seed
Northeastern	14	6	.700	–	1
Maine	14	7	.667	0.5	2
Albany	14	7	.667	0.5	3
Stony Brook	11	10	.524	3.5	4
Vermont	10	11	.476	4.5	–
Binghamton	9	11	.450	5	–
UMBC	6	15	.286	8.5	–
Hartford	5	16	.238	9.5	–

== Results ==
Upper round 1
1	Northeastern	6
4	Stony Brook	15
2	Maine	9
3	Albany	3
Lower round 1
1	Northeastern	1
3	Albany	8

Upper final
4	Stony Brook	6
2	Maine	3
Lower final
2	Maine	11
3	Albany	5

Final
4	Stony Brook
2	Maine

== All-Tournament Team ==
The following players were named to the All-Tournament Team.

Player	Team
Matt Devins	Stony Brook
Andrew Larsen	Stony Brook
Dave Mischo	Stony Brook
Matt Restivo	Stony Brook
Chris Sipp	Stony Brook
Nick Theoharis	Stony Brook
Mike MacDonald	Maine
Matt McGraw	Maine
Jason Martin	Albany
Jeff Heriot	Northeastern

=== Most Outstanding Player ===
Stony Brook outfielder Isidro Fortuna was named Most Outstanding Player.
