= 2025 America East Conference baseball tournament =

American college baseball tournament

- Teams: 6
- Format: Single elimination/Double-elimination
- Finals site: Mahaney Diamond; Orono, Maine
- Champions: Binghamton (6th title)
- Winning coach: Tim Sinicki (6th title)
- MVP: Devan Bade (Binghamton)
- Television: ESPN+

2025 America East Conference baseball standings
	Conf.						Overall
Team	W		L		T	PCT	W		L		T	PCT
Bryant ‍†‍‍	18	–	6	–	0	.750	36	–	19	–	1	.652
NJIT ‍‍‍	14	–	10	–	0	.583	27	–	26	–	0	.509
Binghamton ‍‍‡‍^{y}	13	–	11	–	0	.542	29	–	26	–	0	.527
Maine ‍‍‍	13	–	11	–	0	.542	20	–	31	–	0	.392
Albany ‍‍‍	10	–	14	–	0	.417	22	–	32	–	0	.407
UMBC ‍‍‍	8	–	16	–	0	.333	18	–	28	–	0	.391
UMass Lowell ‍‍‍	8	–	16	–	0	.333	18	–	35	–	0	.340
† – Conference champion ‡ – Tournament champion y – Invited to the NCAA tournament As of May 31, 2025; Rankings from D1Baseball

The 2025 America East Conference baseball tournament was held from May 21 through 24 at Mahaney Diamond in Orono, Maine. The top six regular season finishers of the conference's seven teams met in the tournament. The top two teams had an automatic bye to the double elimination round, while the remaining four teams competed in the single elimination first round. This is the same format that has been used since 2023.

== Seeding and format ==
The top six finishers of the league's seven teams qualify for the tournament. Teams are seeded based on conference winning percentage, with the first tiebreaker being head-to-head record.

== Bracket ==
First round Wednesday, May 21
5	UAlbany	6
4	Maine	4
6	UMBC	8
3	Binghamton	14

Second round Thursday, May 22
5	UAlbany	11
1	Bryant	6
3	Binghamton	15
2	NJIT	10
2	NJIT	1
1	Bryant	4

Semifinals; Saturday, May 24
5	UAlbany	6
3	Binghamton	21
5	UAlbany	2
1	Bryant	8

Championship; Sunday, May 25
3	Binghamton	3	6^{(11)}
1	Bryant	7	5

== Schedule ==
Game	Time*	Matchup^{#}	Score	Notes	Reference
Wednesday, May 21
1	1:00 pm	No. 5 Albany vs No. 4 Maine	6−4	Maine Eliminated	
2	5:00 pm	No. 6 UMBC vs No. 3 Binghamton	8−14	UMBC Eliminated	
Thursday, May 22
3	11:00 am	No. 5 Albany vs No. 1 Bryant	11−6		
4	3:00 pm	No. 3 Binghamton vs No. 2 NJIT	15−10		
5	7:00 pm	No. 2 NJIT vs No. 1 Bryant	1−4	NJIT Eliminated	
Saturday, May 24
6	11:00 am	No. 5 Albany vs No. 3 Binghamton	6−21		
7	3:00 pm	No. 5 Albany vs No. 1 Bryant	2−8	Albany Eliminated	
Sunday, May 25
8	12:00 pm	No. 1 Bryant vs No. 3 Binghamton	7−3		
9	4:00 pm	No. 1 Bryant vs No. 3 Binghamton	5−6 ^{(11)}	Bryant Eliminated	
*Game times in EDT. # – Rankings denote tournament seed.

== All–Tournament Team ==
Player	Team
**Devan Bade**	Binghamton
Freddy Forgione	Binghamton
Zach Kent	Binghamton
Zach Rogacki	Binghamton
Luke Delongchamp	Bryant
Toby Scheidt	Bryant
Jackson Vanesko	Bryant
Leewood Molessa	UMBC
Myles Sargent	Maine
Cole Campbell	NJIT
MT Morrissey	NJIT
Matthew Mariano	Albany
Levi McAllister	Albany

MVP in bold
