= 2003 America East Conference baseball tournament =

American college baseball tournament

- Teams: 4
- Format: Double-elimination
- Finals site: Centennial Field; Burlington, VT
- Champions: Northeastern (3rd title)
- Winning coach: Neil McPhee (3rd title)
- MVP: Miguel Paquette (Northeastern)

The 2003 America East Conference baseball tournament was held from May 22 through 24 at Centennial Field in Burlington, Vermont. The top four regular season finishers of the league's seven teams qualified for the double-elimination tournament. In the championship game, fourth-seeded Northeastern defeated third-seeded Stony Brook, 11–0, to win its third tournament championship. As a result, Northeastern received the America East's automatic bid to the 2003 NCAA tournament.

== Seeding ==
The top four finishers from the regular season were seeded one through four based on conference winning percentage only. They then played in a double-elimination format. In the first round, the one and four seeds were matched up in one game, while the two and three seeds were matched up in the other.

Team	W	L	Pct.	GB	Seed
Vermont	17	5	.773	–	1
Maine	17	7	.708	1	2
Stony Brook	15	9	.625	3	3
Northeastern	12	10	.545	5	4
Albany	10	14	.417	8	–
Hartford	7	15	.318	10	–
Binghamton	2	20	.091	15	–

== Results ==
Upper round 1
1	Vermont	1
4	Northeastern	2
2	Maine	2
3	Stony Brook	4
Lower round 1
1	Vermont	1
2	Maine	5

Upper final
4	Northeastern	5
3	Stony Brook	4
Lower final
3	Stony Brook	6
2	Maine	3

Final
4	Northeastern
3	Stony Brook

== All-Tournament Team ==
The following players were named to the All-Tournament Team.

Player	Team
Justin Hedrick	Northeastern
Jordan Thompson	Northeastern
Miguel Paquette	Northeastern
Arman Sidhu	Northeastern
Brad Czarnowski	Northeastern
Mike Steinberg	Northeastern
Jim McCurdy	Stony Brook
Andrew Larsen	Stony Brook
Lee Lipschutz	Stony Brook
Aaron Izaryk	Maine
Joe Drapeau	Maine

=== Most Outstanding Player ===
Northeastern first baseman Miguel Paquette was named Most Outstanding Player.
