= 2006 America East Conference baseball tournament =

American college baseball tournament

- Teams: 4
- Format: Double-elimination
- Finals site: Centennial Field; Burlington, VT
- Champions: Maine (4th title)
- Winning coach: Steve Trimper (1st title)
- MVP: Mark Ostrander (Maine)

The 2006 America East Conference baseball tournament took place from May 25 through 27 at Centennial Field in Burlington, Vermont. The top four regular season finishers of the league's seven teams qualified for the double-elimination tournament. In the championship game, third-seeded Maine defeated first-seeded Stony Brook, 5-3, to win its fourth tournament championship (its first under head coach Steve Trimper). As a result, Maine received the America East's automatic bid to the 2006 NCAA tournament.

== Seeding ==
The top four finishers from the regular season were seeded one through four based on conference winning percentage only. They then played in a double-elimination format. In the first round, the one and four seeds were matched up in one game, while the two and three seeds were matched up in the other.

Team	W	L	Pct.	GB	Seed
Vermont	16	8	.667	–	1
Stony Brook	13	8	.619	1.5	2
Maine	13	9	.591	2	3
Albany	12	10	.545	3	4
Binghamton	12	11	.522	3.5	–
Hartford	8	16	.333	8	–
UMBC	5	17	.227	10	–

== Results ==
Upper round 1
1	Vermont	5 (Note: 10 innings.)
4	Albany	4
2	Stony Brook	8
3	Maine	11
Lower round 1
4	Albany	3
2	Stony Brook	5

Upper final
1	Vermont	2
3	Maine	5
Lower final
1	Vermont	1
2	Stony Brook	2

Final
3	Maine
2	Stony Brook

== All-Tournament Team ==
The following players were named to the All-Tournament Team.

Player	Team
Mark Ostrander	Maine
AJ Balsinde	Maine
Joel Barrett	Maine
Sean Parker	Maine
Mike Powers	Maine
Jon Pasieka	Stony Brook
Andres Perez	Stony Brook
Matt Restivo	Stony Brook
Jason Carey	Vermont
Steve Wyland	Albany

=== Most Outstanding Player ===
Maine outfielder Mark Ostrander was named Most Outstanding Player.
