= Luke Carlin =

American baseball player (born 1980)

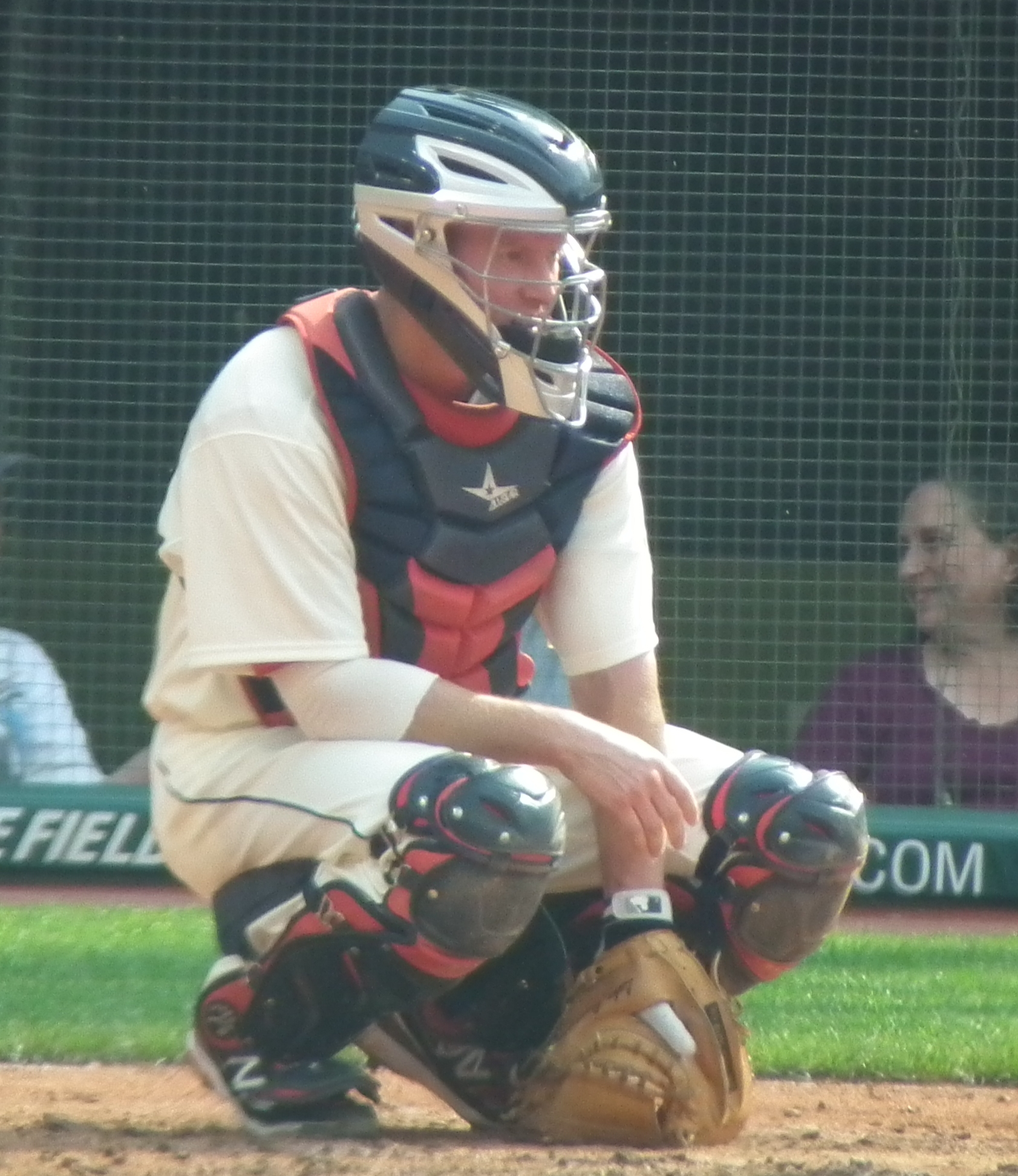
- Carlin with the Cleveland Indians
- Catcher
- Born: December 20, 1980 (age 44); Silver Spring, Maryland, U.S.
- Batted: Switch Threw: Right

MLB debut
- May 10, 2008, for the San Diego Padres

Last MLB appearance
- May 30, 2012, for the Cleveland Indians

MLB statistics
- Batting average: .179
- Home runs: 3
- Runs batted in: 11
- Stats at Baseball Reference

Teams
- As player: San Diego Padres (2008); Arizona Diamondbacks (2009); Cleveland Indians (2010, 2012); As coach: Cleveland Indians / Guardians (2021–2024)

Luke Christopher Carlin (born December 20, 1980) is an American Canadian former professional baseball catcher. He played in Major League Baseball (MLB) for the San Diego Padres, Arizona Diamondbacks, and Cleveland Indians.

== Early life ==
Born in Silver Spring, Maryland, United States, Carlin's family moved to Aylmer, Quebec when he was very young and he played baseball in the province of Quebec, notably for the Quebec Diamants of the Ligue de Baseball Elite du Quebec in 1999, before obtaining a scholarship from Northeastern University, where he played college baseball for the Huskies. In 2001, he played collegiate summer baseball with the Chatham A's of the Cape Cod Baseball League. He was named to the All-Tournament Team at the 2002 America East Tournament, in which the Huskies finished second.

== Professional career ==
=== Detroit Tigers ===
Carlin was drafted by the Detroit Tigers in the 10th round, with the 290th overall selection, of the 2002 Major League Baseball draft and signed his first pro contract on June 18 of the same year and played for the Oneonta Tigers in the New York–Penn League before being released by the Tigers on March 28, 2003.

=== San Diego Padres ===
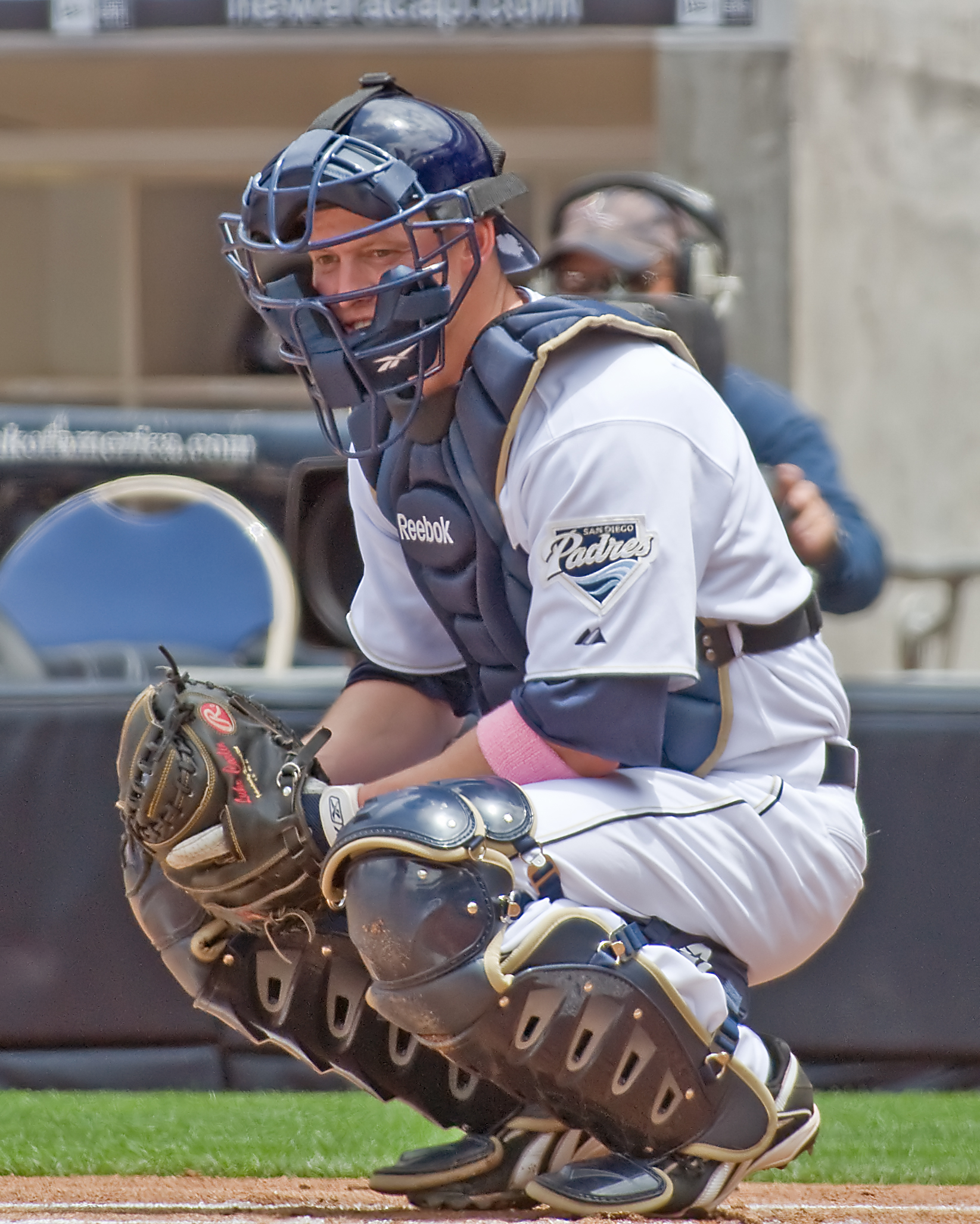
Carlin with the San Diego Padres

Carlin signed with the San Diego Padres on April 29, 2003 and played in their organization for six years with stops with the Eugene Emeralds of the Northwest League (Low–A) and the Fort Wayne Wizards of the Midwest League (Single–A) in 2003, Fort Wayne and the Lake Elsinore Storm of the California League (High–A) in 2004, the Mobile Bay Bears of the Southern League (Double–A) in 2005, Mobile and the Portland Beavers of the Pacific Coast League (Triple–A) in 2006 and Portland in 2007 and 2008.

On May 10, 2008, Carlin made his MLB debut for the San Diego Padres. On May 16, 2008, he came through with his first MLB hit, which was a double against the Colorado Rockies. Carlin became a free agent at the end of the season.

=== Arizona Diamondbacks ===
On January 11, 2009, Carlin signed a minor league contract with the Arizona Diamondbacks. He was recalled to the active roster on June 23, and ultimately played in 10 games for the team, going 3-for-18 (.167) with 1 RBI and 3 stolen bases. On December 3, Carlin was removed from the 40-man roster and sent outright to the Triple-A Reno Aces.

=== Pittsburgh Pirates ===
On January 12, 2010, Carlin signed a minor league contract with the Pittsburgh Pirates that included an invitation to spring training. In 63 appearances for the Triple–A Indianapolis Indians, he batted .239/.331/.317 with two home runs, 23 RBI, and five stolen bases.

=== Cleveland Indians ===
On August 10, 2010, Carlin was traded to the Cleveland Indians in exchange for a player to be named later. His contract was purchased by the Indians from Triple-A Columbus on September 23. Carlin was removed from the 40–man roster and sent outright to the Triple–A Columbus Clippers on October 31. Carlin refused his minor league assignment and subsequently filed for free agency.

On November 29, 2010, Carlin re–signed with Cleveland on a minor league contract that included a non–roster invitation to the Indians' 2011 spring training camp. He played in 63 games for Columbus, batting .213/.364/.335 with five home runs and 27 RBI.

Carlin began 2012 with Columbus, hitting .227 in 20 games with 10 RBI before he was called up to Cleveland on May 26 to replace Carlos Santana, who was placed on the 7-day DL. He was designated for assignment on June 12, and sent to Triple–A on June 15. Carlin elected free agency on October 11.

=== Los Angeles Angels of Anaheim ===
On November 13, 2012, Carlin signed a minor league contract with the Los Angeles Angels of Anaheim. He played in 77 games for the Triple-A Salt Lake Bees in 2013, hitting .230/.339/.312 with four home runs, 29 RBI, and six stolen bases. Carlin elected free agency following the season on November 4, 2013.

=== Cleveland Indians (second stint) ===
On January 24, 2014, Carlin signed a minor league contract with the Cleveland Indians. In 61 games for the Triple-A Columbus Clippers, he slashed .217/.330/.370 with five home runs and 23 RBI.

=== Oakland Athletics ===
On January 22, 2015, Carlin signed a minor league contract with the Oakland Athletics. In 34 games for the Triple-A Nashville Sounds, he batted .146/.315/.214 with no home runs and 11 RBI. Carlin was released by the Athletics organization on July 1.

=== Chicago Cubs ===
On July 17, 2015, Carlin signed a minor league contract with the Chicago Cubs. In 21 games for the Triple-A Iowa Cubs, he slashed .182/.318/.273 with two home runs and one stolen base. Carlin elected free agency following the season on November 6.

On February 6, 2016, Carlin signed a minor league contract with the Detroit Tigers organization. He was released prior to the start of the season on March 31.

== Coaching career ==
On January 17, 2018, Carlin was named manager of the Lake County Captains, the Single–A affiliate of the Cleveland Indians.

== Personal life ==
Carlin is a Canadian citizen. He is married to Kim Carlin (Lewis) and they share two daughters, Olivia and Evelyn.
