= 2002 America East Conference baseball tournament =

American college baseball tournament

- Teams: 4
- Format: Double-elimination
- Finals site: Mahaney Diamond; Orono, ME
- Champions: Maine (2nd title)
- Winning coach: Paul Kostacopoulos (1st title)
- MVP: Brett Ouellette (Maine)

The 2002 America East Conference baseball tournament was held from May 23 through 25 at Mahaney Diamond in Orono, Maine. The top four regular season finishers of the league's seven teams qualified for the double-elimination tournament. In the championship game, first-seeded Maine defeated third-seeded Northeastern, 7-5, to win its second tournament championship (its first under head coach Paul Kostacopoulos). As a result, Maine received the America East's automatic bid to the 2002 NCAA tournament.

== Seeding ==
The top four finishers from the regular season were seeded one through four based on conference winning percentage only. They then played in a double-elimination format. In the first round, the one and four seeds were matched up in one game, while the two and three seeds were matched up in the other.

Team	W	L	Pct.	GB	Seed
Maine	16	6	.727	–	1
Vermont	14	8	.636	2	2
Northeastern	11	11	.500	5	3
Stony Brook	11	11	.500	5	4
Binghamton	8	12	.400	7	–
Albany	8	14	.364	8	–
Hartford	8	14	.364	8	–

== Results ==
Upper round 1
1	Maine	4
4	Stony Brook	16
2	Vermont	2
3	Northeastern	5
Lower round 1
1	Maine	8
2	Vermont	2

Upper final
4	Stony Brook	5
3	Northeastern	10
Lower final
4	Stony Brook	3
1	Maine	9

Final
2	Northeastern
1	Maine

== All-Tournament Team ==
The following players were named to the All-Tournament Team.

Player	Team
Paul Bruder	Maine
Brett Ouellette	Maine
Joe Drapeau	Maine
Mike Ross	Maine
Mike Livulpi	Maine
Aaron Izaryk	Maine
Devin Monds	Northeastern
Luke Carlin	Northeastern
Colin Gaynor	Northeastern
Omar Pena	Northeastern
Dwayne Whitaker	Stony Brook

=== Most Outstanding Player ===
Maine second baseman Brett Ouellette was named Most Outstanding Player.
