= 2026 America East Conference baseball tournament =

American college baseball tournament

- Teams: 6
- Format: Double-elimination
- Finals site: Binghamton Baseball Complex; Vestal, New York
- Champions: Binghamton (7th title)
- Winning coach: Tim Sinicki (7th title)
- MVP: Matt Bolton (Binghamton)

2026 America East Conference baseball standings
	Conf.						Overall
Team	W		L		T	PCT	W		L		T	PCT
Binghamton ‍†‍‡‍^{y}	17	–	7	–	0	.708	28	–	20	–	0	.583
UMBC ‍‍‍	15	–	9	–	0	.625	28	–	22	–	0	.560
Maine ‍‍‍	14	–	10	–	0	.583	20	–	30	–	0	.400
Bryant ‍‍‍	13	–	11	–	0	.542	27	–	24	–	0	.529
UMass Lowell ‍‍‍	10	–	14	–	0	.417	20	–	29	–	0	.408
Albany ‍‍‍	9	–	15	–	0	.375	15	–	33	–	0	.313
NJIT ‍‍‍	6	–	18	–	0	.250	16	–	31	–	1	.344
† – Conference champion ‡ – Tournament champion y – Invited to the NCAA tournament As of May 17, 2026; Rankings from D1Baseball

The 2026 America East Conference Baseball Tournament will be held from May 20 to 23, 2026 to determine the champion of the America East Conference for the 2026 NCAA Division I baseball season. The top six teams out of the league's seven members will meet in the double-elimination tournament held at Binghamton Baseball Complex in Vestal, New York, the home park of Binghamton. The tournament champion will receive the conference's automatic bid into the 2026 NCAA Division I baseball tournament.

== Seeding and format ==
The top six teams from the regular season are seeded one through six based on conference winning percentage only. The top two teams receive a first-round bye with the remaining four teams playing a single-elimination play-in game. The top two teams and the two play-in winners will then play a double-elimination tournament.

== Bracket ==
Play-In Games
3	Maine	11
6	Albany	5
4	Bryant	5
5	UMass Lowell	7^{(11)}

Quarterfinals
1	Binghamton	3
5	UMass Lowell	0
2	UMBC	4
3	Maine	5
Lower round 2
5	UMass Lowell	0
2	UMBC	9

Semifinal
1	Binghamton	6
3	Maine	5
Lower final
3	Maine	11
2	UMBC	6

Finals
1	Binghamton	7	-
3	Maine	3	-

== Schedule ==
Game	Time*	Matchup^{#}	Score	Notes	Reference
Wednesday, May 20
1	1:00 pm	No. 5 UMass Lowell vs. No. 4 Bryant	7–5 (11)	Bryant eliminated	
2	5:00 pm	No. 6 Albany vs. No. 3 Maine	5–11	Albany eliminated	
Thursday, May 21
3	11:00 am	No. 5 UMass Lowell vs. No. 1 Binghamton	0–3		
4	3:00 pm	No. 3 Maine vs. No. 2 UMBC	5–4		
5	7:00 pm	No. 5 UMass Lowell vs. No. 2 UMBC	0–9	UMass Lowell eliminated	
Friday, May 22
6	1:00 pm	No. 3 Maine vs. No. 1 Binghamton	5–6		
7	5:00 pm	No. 3 Maine vs. No. 2 UMBC	11–6	UMBC eliminated	
Saturday, May 23
8	7:00 pm	No. 3 Maine vs. No. 1 Binghamton	3–7	Championship game	
*Game times in EDT. # – Rankings denote tournament seed.

== All–Tournament Team ==
Player	Team
**Matt Bolton**	Binghamton
Tim Hennig	Binghamton
Conner Griffin	Binghamton
Steven Kraus	Binghamton
Pierce Friedman	Maine
Quinn Murphy	Maine
Hunter St. Denis	Maine
Cooper Loyal	Albany
Aidan Vining	Bryant
Alfred Mucciarone	UMass Lowell
Nick Solorzano	UMass Lowell
Zach Robinson	UMBC
Dylan Melton	UMBC

MVP in bold
