= 1993 North Atlantic Conference baseball tournament =

American college baseball tournament

- Teams: 8
- Format: Best-of-three quarterfinals Double-elimination final round
- Finals site: Delaware Diamond (baseball); Newark, DE
- Champions: Maine (1st title)
- Winning coach: John Winkin (1st title)
- MVP: Gabe Duross (Maine)

The 1993 North Atlantic Conference baseball tournament was held over two weekends, with the final round being played at Delaware Diamond in Newark, Delaware. All eight of the league's teams qualified for the tournament, the format of which was best-of-three quarterfinals and a four-team double-elimination final round. In the championship game, first-seeded Maine defeated fifth-seeded Drexel, 11-1, to win its first tournament championship. As a result, Maine received the North Atlantic's automatic bid to the 1993 NCAA tournament.

== Standings ==
The teams were seeded based on conference winning percentage only. They were then matched up for an opening round of four best-of-three series.

=== Division standings ===
Northern Division
Pos	Team	Pld	CW	CL	CPCT	GB	W	L	PCT	Qualification
1	y – Maine	60	22	4	.846	—	33	27	.550	Qualification for the Quarterfinals & NCAA tournament
2	New Hampshire	43	15	10	.600	6.5	23	20	.535	Qualification for the Quarterfinals
3	Vermont	43	15	13	.536	8	25	18	.581	Qualification for the Quarterfinals
4	Northeastern	36	7	14	.333	12.5	17	19	.472	Qualification for the Quarterfinals

y – Division champion

Southern Division
Pos	Team	Pld	CW	CL	CPCT	GB	W	L	PCT	Qualification
1	y – Delaware	49	14	12	.538	—	28	21	.571	Qualification for the Quarterfinals
2	Drexel	48	12	11	.522	0.5	24	24	.500	Qualification for the Quarterfinals
3	Hartford	47	9	15	.375	4	20	27	.426	Qualification for the Quarterfinals
4	Boston University	32	2	17	.105	8.5	5	27	.156	Qualification for the Quarterfinals

y – Division champion

=== Conference standings ===
Pos	Div	Team	Pld	CW	CL	CPCT	GB	W	L	PCT	Qualification
1	N	Maine (C)	60	22	4	.846	—	33	27	.550	Qualification for the Quarterfinals & NCAA tournament
2	N	New Hampshire	43	15	10	.600	6.5	23	20	.535	Qualification for the Quarterfinals
3	S	Delaware	49	14	12	.538	8	28	21	.571	Qualification for the Quarterfinals
4	N	Vermont	43	15	13	.536	8	25	18	.581	Qualification for the Quarterfinals
5	S	Drexel	48	12	11	.522	8.5	24	24	.500	Qualification for the Quarterfinals
6	S	Hartford	47	9	15	.375	12	20	27	.426	Qualification for the Quarterfinals
7	N	Northeastern	36	7	14	.333	12.5	17	19	.472	Qualification for the Quarterfinals
8	S	Boston University	32	2	17	.105	16.5	5	27	.156	Qualification for the Quarterfinals

(C) Champion

== Results ==
Quarterfinals
1N	Maine	5	2	5
4N	Northeastern	4	5	2
2N	New Hampshire	5	3	6
3N	Vermont	20	2	2
1S	Delaware	13	6	—
4S	Boston University	2	1	—
2S	Drexel	4	4	–
3S	Hartford	2	3	–

Upper round 2
1N	Maine	8
2S	Drexel	4
2N	New Hampshire	4
1S	Delaware	6
Lower round 1
2S	Drexel	6
2N	New Hampshire	1

Upper final
1N	Maine	6
1S	Delaware	1^{11}
Lower final
1S	Delaware	7
2S	Drexel	9

Final
1N	Maine	11	—
2S	Drexel	1	—

== All-Tournament Team ==
The following players were named to the All-Tournament Team.

Player	Team
Mark Ballard	Maine
Bill Champi	Maine
Ron Hewes	Maine
Mike Sidoti	Maine
Shawn Tobin	Maine
Justin Tomberlin	Maine
Chad White	Maine
Adam White	Drexel
Bill DiIenno	Delaware
Bruce Hannah	Delaware
Fran McHugh	New Hampshire

=== Most Outstanding Player ===
Maine first baseman Gabe Duross was named Most Outstanding Player.
