= 2005 America East Conference baseball tournament =

American college baseball tournament

- Teams: 4
- Format: Double-elimination
- Finals site: Centennial Field; Burlington, VT
- Champions: Maine (3rd title)
- Winning coach: Paul Kostacopoulos (2nd title)
- MVP: Joe Hough (Maine)

The 2005 America East Conference baseball tournament took place from May 26 through 28 at Centennial Field in Burlington, Vermont. The top four regular season finishers of the league's eight teams qualified for the double-elimination tournament. In the championship game, second-seeded Maine defeated third-seeded Vermont, 6-5, to win its third tournament championship (its second under head coach Paul Kostacopoulos). As a result, Maine received the America East's automatic bid to the 2005 NCAA tournament.

== Seeding ==
The top four finishers from the regular season were seeded one through four based on conference winning percentage only. They then played in a double-elimination format. In the first round, the one and four seeds were matched up in one game, while the two and three seeds were matched up in the other.

Team	W	L	Pct.	GB	Seed
Northeastern	14	6	.700	–	1
Maine	14	7	.667	0.5	2
Vermont	14	7	.667	0.5	3
Binghamton	12	8	.600	2	4
Albany	10	11	.476	4.5	–
Stony Brook	10	11	.476	4.5	–
UMBC	6	15	.286	8.5	–
Hartford	3	18	.143	11.5	–

== Results ==
Upper round 1
1	Northeastern	7
4	Binghamton	3
2	Maine	14
3	Vermont	2
Lower round 1
4	Binghamton	0
3	Vermont	2

Upper final
1	Northeastern	0
2	Maine	12
Lower final
1	Northeastern	5
3	Vermont	6

Final
2	Maine
3	Vermont

== All-Tournament Team ==
The following players were named to the All-Tournament Team.

Player	Team
Joe Hough	Maine
Greg Creek	Maine
Ryan Quintal	Maine
Mike Ferrigii	Maine
Greg Norton	Maine
Frank Rossi	Vermont
Jason Carey	Vermont
Aaron Izaryk	Vermont
Michael Magrass	Vermont
Derek Miller	Vermont

=== Most Outstanding Player ===
Maine outfielder Joe Hough was named Most Outstanding Player.
