= Mahaney Diamond =

Baseball stadium in Orono, Maine, US

Larry Mahaney Diamond
- Interactive map of Larry Mahaney Diamond
- Location: University of Maine campus; Long Road, Orono, Maine, US
- Coordinates: 44.904692°N 68.669368°W
- Owner: University of Maine
- Operator: University of Maine
- Capacity: 4,400
- Surface: FieldTurf
- Scoreboard: Electronic
- Field size: Left field: 330 feet (100 m); Left center field: 375 feet (114 m); Center field: 400 feet (120 m); Right center field: 375 feet (114 m); Right field: 330 feet (100 m)

Construction
- Renovated: 1984, 1989, 1993, 1994, late 1990s, 2001, 2003, 2004, 2008
- Expanded: 1986, 2004

Tenants
- Maine Black Bears baseball (NCAA DI AEC); Bangor Blue Ox (NAL) (1996–97); Bangor Lumberjacks (NL) (2003); NCAA Division I Northeast Regional (1991); ECAC Tournament (1990–1); AEC Tournament (1996, 2002, 2004, 2018)

Larry Mahaney Diamond is a baseball stadium in Orono, Maine, located on the campus of the University of Maine. It is the home of the Maine Black Bears baseball team. Its capacity is 4,400 spectators. It opened in the early 1980s.

== Usage ==
From 1996 to 1997, the field was the home of the Bangor Blue Ox of the independent Northeast League.

In 2003, the venue was the home of the Bangor Lumberjacks, also of the Northeast League. Following the 2003 season, the team moved to the Winkin Sports Complex on the campus of Husson College in Bangor, Maine.

In 1991, Mahaney Diamond hosted the NCAA Northeast Regional. The field has also hosted two ECAC Tournaments, in 1990 and 1991. It has hosted three America East Conference baseball tournaments, in 1993, 2002, and 2004. In 2002, Maine won the tournament on its home field.

== Naming ==
In 1977, the field was officially dedicated to Larry Mahaney, a Bangor resident and university alumnus who was president of Webber Oil Company at the time. His donations allowed for several renovations to the park. Mahaney died in 2006.

== See also ==
- List of NCAA Division I baseball venues
