= Bob Hannah (baseball) =

American baseball player (died 2025)

Robert M. Hannah (c. 1931 – December 14, 2025) was an American college baseball coach who served as head coach of the Delaware Fightin' Blue Hens baseball team from 1965 to 2000.

== Playing career ==
Hannah was born around 1931. He played basketball and baseball at Wesley College in Dover, Delaware, in the 1950s.

== Coaching career and honors ==
During his tenure, he was one of the most successful intercollegiate baseball coaches in the country, producing over 1,000 wins in a 35-year career. Hannah's baseball teams have had many successful seasons including eight straight 30 win seasons from 1976–1983 and five straight 40 win seasons from 1994–1998. Hannah coached many Major League Baseball players including pitcher Steve Taylor who was a No. 1 draft pick of the New York Yankees in 1977. In 2000, the Delaware Baseball Stadium was renamed Bob Hannah Stadium in his honor.

Hannah was named America East Coach of the Year five times, a conference record.

He was inducted into the Delaware Sports Hall of Fame in 1998. The News Journal ranked him fourth on their 2023 list of the "125 Greatest Coaches in Delaware History".

== Death ==
Hannah died on December 14, 2025, in Newark, Delaware, at the age of 93.
