= Daniel S. Frawley Stadium =

Stadium in Wilmington, Delaware, US

- Judy Johnson Field

- Aerial view during a game, April 2026

- Location within Delaware Location within the United States
- Interactive map of Daniel S. Frawley Stadium
- Full name: Judy Johnson Field at Daniel S. Frawley Stadium
- Former names: Legends Stadium (1993)
- Address: 801 Shipyard Drive; Wilmington, Delaware 19801
- Coordinates: 39°43′56″N 75°33′52″W
- Owner: Delaware Stadium Corporation
- Operator: Delaware Stadium Corporation
- Capacity: 5,911 (1993–2000); 6,532 (2001–2015); 6,404 (2016–present)
- Surface: Grass
- Field size: Right Field – 325 feet Center Field – 400 feet Left Field – 325 feet
- Public transit: DART First State bus: 25

Construction
- Groundbreaking: November 1, 1992
- Opened: April 16, 1993
- Expanded: 2001
- Cost: $6,100,000 ($13.6 million in 2025 dollars)
- Architects: The Design Exchange, Wilmington, DE
- Project manager: Opening Day Partners
- General contractor: Minker Construction Company

Tenants
- Wilmington Blue Rocks (CL/SAL) 1993–present AEC Tournament 1995, 1997–2001; Delaware Stars (MFB) 1998

Daniel S. Frawley Stadium is a stadium in Wilmington, Delaware. It is primarily used for baseball, and is the home field of the Wilmington Blue Rocks minor league baseball team. The park was originally known as Legends Stadium when it was built in 1993. It was renamed in 1994 for Wilmington mayor Daniel S. Frawley, who had pushed for a return of the Blue Rocks. The field is named separately for Judy Johnson, a local Negro league baseball star.

== History ==
The stadium was designed by architect Trish England, head of Design Exchange, who had previously designed dozens of commercial buildings in Delaware. Construction began on November 1, 1992, and was headed by contractor Matthew Minker, a part owner of the team. The 20-acre (81,000 m^{2}) stadium site was once part of a Christina River shipbuilding operation. In 1986, the 86-acre (350,000 m^{2}) Dravo Shipyard, with several buildings, was bought by Verino Pettinaro, a local contractor, for a little more than $1 million. Pettinaro sold 6 acres (24,000 m^{2}) for the stadium to the Delaware Stadium Corporation for $300,000. The Delaware Stadium Corporation, a city and state entity, has owned the stadium since its construction.

== Amenities ==
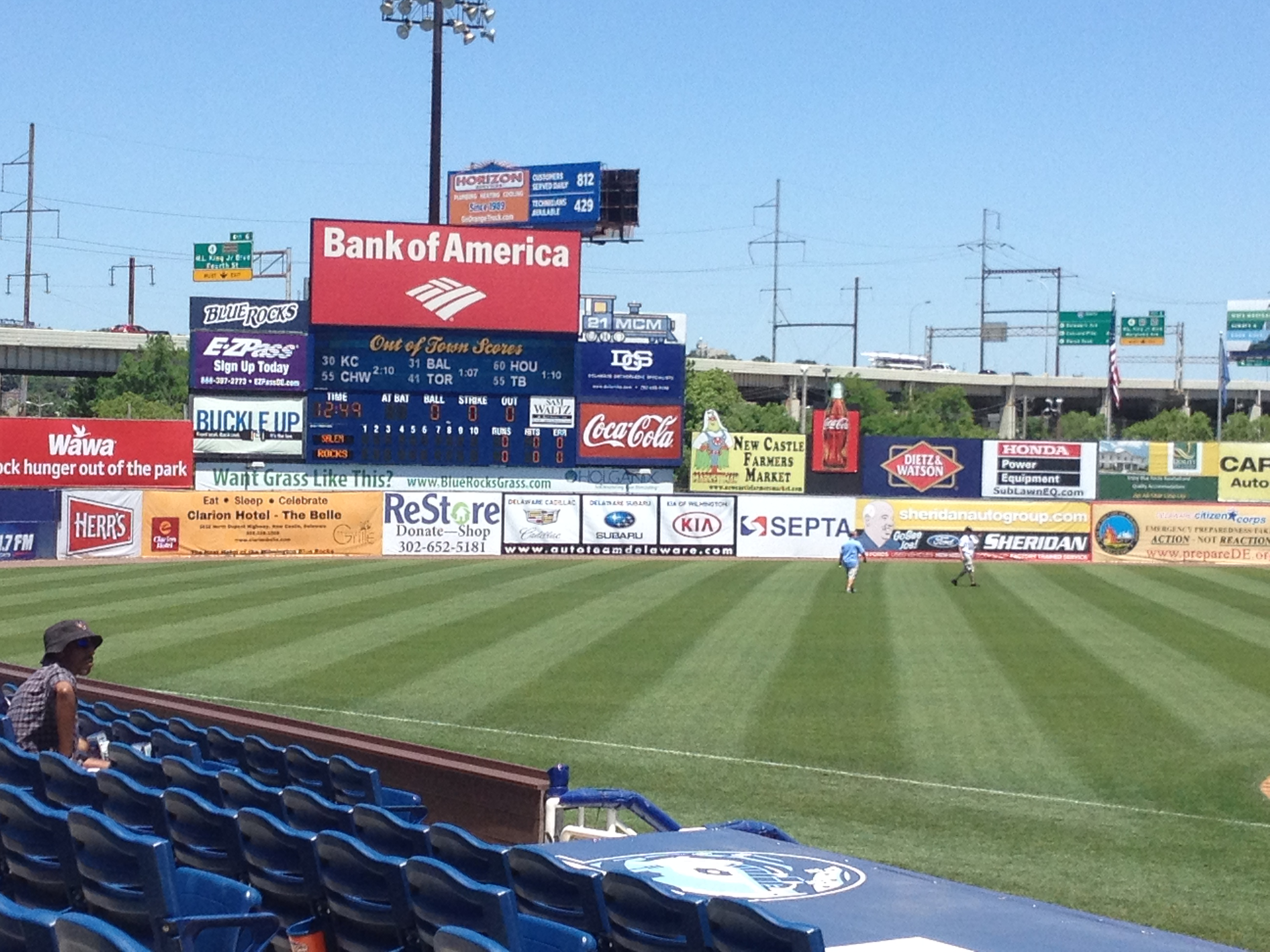
A view of left field at Frawley Stadium and the scoreboard

The stadium seats 6,404 people. The Blue Rocks have a picnic area in the stadium named the Blue Moose Grill and a gift shop, The Quarry. A formerly abandoned building across the street has been renovated to be similar to Camden Yards. The facility is administered by the Delaware Stadium Corporation.

== Other uses ==
In 1995 and from 1997 to 2001, stadium hosted the America East Conference baseball tournament. The hosting Delaware Blue Hens won the tournament in each year except for 1997.

In 1998, the stadium hosted the Delaware Stars, a team in the single-season Maryland Fall Baseball league.

The Delaware Sports Museum and Hall of Fame has exhibit space through an entrance on the outside of the stadium. The stadium has also held many concerts, including Wilco, the Beach Boys, the Steve Miller Band, and recently the Round the Bases Tour, which featured Counting Crows, Live, and Collective Soul. Starting in 2008, the Delaware Indo-American festival was held at the site.
