= Delaware Fightin' Blue Hens baseball =

Delaware Fightin' Blue Hens
- 2026 Delaware Fightin' Blue Hens baseball team
- Founded: 1882; 144 years ago
- Conference history: Middle Atlantic (1923–1958); ECC (1959–1990); America East (1991–2001); CAA (2002–2025)
- Overall record: 2,104–1,365–27
- University: University of Delaware
- Head coach: Greg Mamula (4th season)
- Conference: Conference USA
- Location: Newark, Delaware
- Home stadium: Bob Hannah Stadium (Capacity: 1,300)
- Nickname: Fightin' Blue Hens
- Colors: Royal blue and gold

College World Series appearances
- 1970

NCAA tournament appearances
- 1956, 1960, 1961, 1970, 1978, 1979, 1980, 1982, 1983, 1992, 1996, 1998, 1999, 2000, 2001, 2017

Conference tournament champions
- 1995, 1996, 1998, 1999, 2000, 2001, 2017

Conference regular season champions
- 1961, 1964, 1970, 1992, 1994, 1995, 1996, 1997, 1998, 2000, 2001

The Delaware Fightin' Blue Hens baseball team is the varsity intercollegiate athletic team of the University of Delaware in Newark, Delaware, United States. The team competes in the National Collegiate Athletic Association's Division I and are members of the Conference USA.

== Delaware in the NCAA Tournament ==
Year	Record	Pct	Notes
1956	0–1	.000	District 2 Regional
1960	1–1	.500	District 2 Regional
1961	0–1	.000	District 2 Regional
1970	3-2	.600	College World Series 7th place, District 2 Champions
1978	2-2	.500	Northeast Regional
1979	3-2	.600	East Regional
1980	2-2	.500	East Regional
1982	1-2	.333	Northeast Regional
1983	3-2	.600	East Regional
1992	1-2	.333	Atlantic Regional
1996	0-2	.000	Midwest Regional
1998	0-2	.000	Atlantic II Regional
1999	0-2	.000	Fayetteville Regional
2000	0-2	.000	Oklahoma City Regional
2001	1-2	.333	Columbus Regional
2017	0-2	.000	Lubbock Regional
Totals	16–29	.356	
