= Vermont Catamounts =

Athletic programs of the University of Vermont

- University: University of Vermont
- Nickname: Catamounts
- NCAA: Division I
- Conference: America East Conference (primary); Hockey East; EISA (skiing)
- Athletic director: Jeff Schulman
- Location: Burlington, Vermont
- Varsity teams: 18 (8 men's, 10 women's)
- Basketball arena: Patrick Gym
- Soccer stadium: Virtue Field
- Lacrosse stadium: Virtue Field
- Other venues: Gutterson Fieldhouse
- Colors: Green and gold
- Mascot: Rally
- Fight song: "Vermont Victorious"
- Website: uvmathletics.com

The Vermont Catamounts are the varsity intercollegiate athletic programs of the University of Vermont, based in Burlington, Vermont, United States. The school sponsors 18 athletic programs (8 men's, 10 women's), most of which compete in the NCAA Division I America East Conference (AEC), of which the school has been a member since 1979. The men's and women's ice hockey programs compete in Hockey East. The men's and women's alpine and Nordic skiing teams compete in the Eastern Intercollegiate Ski Association (EISA). The school's athletic director is Jeff Schulman.

The Catamounts have won seven national championships, six in skiing (the latest in 2012) and one in men's soccer (2024). The program's mascot is Rally and colors are green and gold.

== Sponsored sports ==
Men's sports	Women's sports
Basketball	Basketball
Cross country	Cross country
Ice hockey	Field hockey
Lacrosse	Ice hockey
Soccer	Lacrosse
Track and field^{1}	Soccer
	Swimming
	Track and field^{1}
Co-ed sports
Skiing
^{1} – includes both indoor and outdoor

America East Conference logo in Vermont's colors

Vermont is one of only four NCAA Division I schools that do not sponsor volleyball or baseball. The other three are Boston University, Detroit Mercy, and Drexel.

=== Basketball ===
The men's basketball team won the 2003, 2004, 2005, 2010, 2012, 2017, 2019, 2022, 2023, and 2024 America East Conference Championships, qualifying for the NCAA Tournament in each of those seasons. In the 2005 NCAA tournament, the team, seeded #13 in the Austin Regional, upset #4 Syracuse 60–57 in overtime. Sports Illustrated named the upset one of the top 10 NCAA Tournament upsets of the 2000s.

=== Ice hockey ===
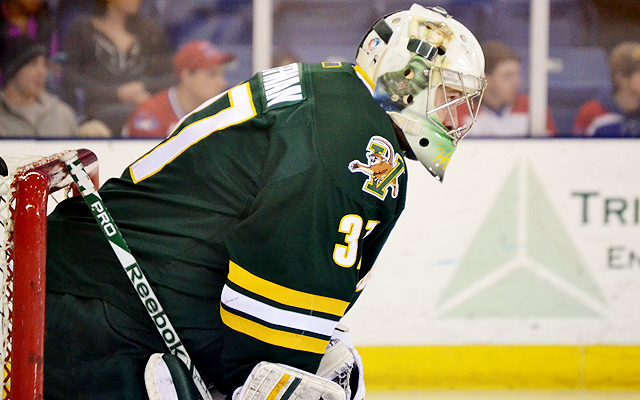
A Catamounts men's ice hockey game in 2014

The men's ice hockey team appeared in the NCAA Tournament Frozen Four in 1996 and 2009. They also qualified for the NCAA Tournament in 1988, 1997, 2010, and 2014.

UVM's men's hockey team has produced 18 NHL players in its history. UVM alumni currently in the NHL include Viktor Stålberg '09 (New York Rangers), Torrey Mitchell '07 (Montreal Canadiens), Patrick Sharp '02 (Dallas Stars), Kevan Miller '11 (Boston Bruins), Connor Brickley '14 (Florida Panthers) and Michael Paliotta '15 (Chicago Blackhawks). Martin St. Louis '97, Eric Perrin '97, Sharp, Tim Thomas '97, and former NHL All-Star John LeClair '91 won the Stanley Cup in their careers. In 2004, St. Louis was awarded the Hart Memorial Trophy as the NHL's MVP, the Art Ross Trophy as the NHL's leading scorer, and the Lester B. Pearson Award as the league's most outstanding player in the regular season as judged by the members of the NHL Players Association. Thomas was awarded the Vezina Trophy as the NHL's top goaltender in 2009 and 2011, and the Conn Smythe Trophy as the most valuable player of the 2011 Stanley Cup playoffs. UVM is the only NCAA program in history to count alumni who have won both the Hart Trophy and the Vezina Trophy, as well as the only NCAA program to generate an Art Ross winner.

=== Skiing ===
The UVM ski team has won six national championships (1980, 1989, 1990, 1992, 1994, 2012) and 33 EISA titles, most recently in 2014. The team has had 54 individual national champions, over 273 All-Americans, and 66 US Ski Team members.

=== Soccer ===
The men's soccer team has appeared in the NCAA Tournament twelve times, including trips to the NCAA Tournament Quarterfinals in 1989 and 2022, and the finals in 2024, winning the National Championship game against the Marshall Thundering Herd 2–1 in extra time.

=== Women's teams ===
==== Basketball ====
Vermont's women's basketball team has performed well in the America East tournament. In 2013, it made a conference-record 18th appearance in the semifinals. It has the most wins in tournament play, with 35 (2013 field). It has advanced at least one round in 19 of the 24 tournaments.

The Catamounts were the first women's basketball program to go undefeated during the regular season in back-to-back seasons (1991–1992 and 1992–1993), a feat matched only by Connecticut (2008–2009 and 2009–2010).

In the 2012–2013 season, the program had a total attendance mark of 10,579.

=== Former varsity teams ===
==== Baseball ====
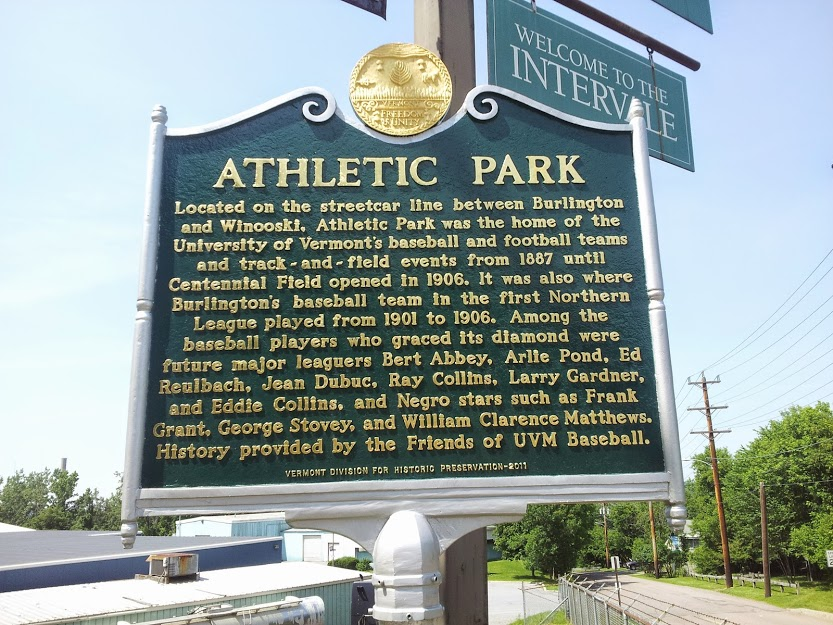
Vermont Division for Historic Preservation marker at former site of University of Vermont Athletic Park, home to UVM baseball, football, and track and field, 1887 to 1904. (June 2014).

After the 2009 season, the Vermont baseball program, which played at Centennial Field, was cut along with softball as a part of the university's budget cuts. Prior to the cuts of 2009, Vermont baseball was the winningest program at UVM with a .532 winning percentage (1485–1306).

Ten Vermont baseball players reached the major leagues, including Larry Gardner, who started at third base for four World Series champions in his 17-year (1908–24) big league career, lefthanded pitcher Ray Collins, who won 87 games in seven MLB seasons and started the first World Series game ever played at Fenway Park, and Kirk McCaskill, who won 110 games during his Major League career.

==== Football ====
Vermont had a varsity football team that competed from 1886 until 1974. They were members of the Yankee Conference from 1947 until the program was disbanded. With the end of their football team, Vermont become the only contiguous US state without a D1 football team.

=== Nickname and mascot history ===
On February 6, 1928, The Vermont Cynic asked the University of Vermont undergraduates if they would like to have a mascot. The choices offered up by ballot were a tomcat, camel, cow, or catamount. By a vote of 138–126 the catamount became the first University of Vermont Mascot, Charlie Catamount.

For a brief time between 1968 and 1969 UVM had a live mascot named "Rink". Rink was a puma cub born in captivity at a Peoria, Illinois zoo and owned by avid hockey fans Nancy and Robert "Tiny" Leggett, of South Burlington, VT. As Rink grew from 10 lbs to over 100 lbs the couple became unable to care for him and were reported plans to donate him to Canada's Granby Zoo.

Kitty Catamount joined Charlie as a "Catamount Couple" and the two mascots were married at a UVM hockey game in the 1970s.

A taxidermied catamount named Greta is kept on display in the UVM Dudley H. Davis Student Center, as of 2023. Prior to her restoration in 2021, she was kept in the UVM Marsh Life Science building. Greta is one of 15 remaining specimens of her species. She also has multiple student-run Instagram pages (@greta_uvm, @officialgretathecatamount).

In a rebranding of mascots, Rally Cat was introduced in 2003.

== Facilities ==
As of 2025, Vermont is in the process of replacing Patrick Gym with a new arena called the Tarrant Center, although construction is on pause with no timeline to resume.
