= Machine (disambiguation) =

A machine is a device that uses energy to perform some activity or task.

Machine, Machines, Machinery, The Machine, or The Machines may also refer to:

== Term of art ==
More specific applications of the general term

- Machine (mechanical) device designed to apply forces and control movement
- Machine (patent), one of the four statutory categories of patent-eligible subject matter under United States patent law

== Computing ==
- a.k.a. computer
  - Abstract machine, a theoretical model of a computer hardware or software system used in automata theory
    - Turing machine, an abstract model of a computer
  - virtual machine, a computing machine implemented in software rather than directly in hardware
  - Machine-generated data
- Machines (video game), a 1999 real-time strategy game for Microsoft Windows
- The Machine (computer architecture), a computer architecture project announced in 2014 by Hewlett Packard

== Personal nickname ==
The following are nicknamed "The Machine":

- Bert Kreischer (born 1973), American stand-up comedian, actor, and reality television host
- Albert Pujols (born 1980), Dominican-American baseball player
- Vimael Machín (born 1993), Puerto Rican baseball player
- Sasha Vujačić (born 1984), Slovenian basketball player
- James Wade (born 1983), English darts player
- Merab Dvalishvili (born 1991), Georgian mixed martial artist

== Music ==
- Machine (band) a late-1970s American funk disco group
- Machine (producer), American record producer
- The Machine (band), a US Pink Floyd tribute band formed in 1988
- Machinery Records, a German record label founded in 1989
- In Florence and the Machine, the band backing lead singer Florence Welch
- Machine (Higdon), a 2003 orchestral composition by Jennifer Higdon

=== Albums ===
- Machine (Artension album), a 2000 album by neo-classical progressive metal band Artension
- Machine (Crack the Sky album), a 2010 album by Crack the Sky
- Machine (Static-X album), a 2001 album by Static-X
- Machine (EP), a 2002 EP by Yeah Yeah Yeahs and also the title of a single from that EP
- Machines (EP), a 1966 EP by Manfred Mann
- Machine, a 1994 album by Paul Dean

=== Songs ===
- "Machines" (or 'Back to Humans'), a 1984 song by Queen
- "Machines" (Biffy Clyro song), 2007
- "Machines" (Red Flag song), 1992
- "Machine" (Imagine Dragons song), 2018
- "Machine" (Theatre of Tragedy song), 2001
- "The Machine" a song from deathcore band In the Midst of Lions
- "The Machine", a 2006 song by Angels & Airwaves from the album We Don't Need to Whisper
- "The Machine", a 2007 song by Reverend and the Makers from the album The State of Things
- "The Machines", a marching band work composed by Gary P. Gilroy
- "Machines", a song by The Jealous Girlfriends from the eponymous album
- "Machine", a 2009 song by Regina Spektor from the album Far
- "Machine", a 1998 song by Vixen from the album Tangerine
- "Machine", a 2018 song by Anne-Marie from the album Speak Your Mind

== Sports ==
- Chicago Machine (MLL), a major league lacrosse team based in Bridgeport, Illinois
- Montreal Machine, an American Football team based in Canada from 1991 to 1992
- The Machines (professional wrestling), a tag team in the 1980s
- The Machine (Richard), a character in the 2013 Irish film The Stag (also called The Bachelor Weekend)
- La Máquina (Spanish for "the Machine"), nickname of the River Plate association football team of the early 1940s

== Fiction ==
- Machine (novel), a 1930 Japanese novel by Riichi Yokomitsu
- The Machine (1977 film), a French drama film
- The Machine (1994 film), a French science fiction thriller film
- Machine (2006 film), an American action film
- The Machine (2013 film), a British science fiction film
- Machine (2017 film), a Bollywood film
- The Machine (2023 film), an American action comedy film
- Machines (Horizon), fictional robotic animals in the video game series Horizon
- Machines (Nier: Automata), a fictional robotic race in the video game Nier: Automata
- "Machines" (Silo), a 2023 television episode
- The Machine, a surveillance computer in the 2011–2016 American TV series Person of Interest
- The Machine, the interstellar-travel device in Contact a 1985 novel by Carl Sagan
- Machine, a character in the 1999 film 8mm
- Alexis Machine / George Stark, a character in the 1989 novel The Dark Half by Stephen King
- Machine, a 2020 novel by Elizabeth Bear
- "The Machine", a 2026 episode from the American animated web-series Animator vs. Animation

== Other uses ==
- Mount Machine, mountain in Japan
- Political machine, a vote-delivering and political power-broking system
- AMC Machine, 1970 and 1971 muscle cars built by the American Motors Corporation (AMC)
- The Machine (social group), a University of Alabama coalition of fraternities and sororities
- The Machine: Bride of Pin•Bot, a 1991 pinball machine made by Williams
- Machine (nightclub), Boston gay club

== See also ==
- Rage Against the Machine, American rock band
- "My Machines", a song by Battles from the album Gloss Drop
- Engine (disambiguation)
- Mechanism (disambiguation)
- Mechanical (disambiguation)
- Mechanics (disambiguation)
