= 2012 Stony Brook Seawolves baseball team =

American college baseball season

2012 Stony Brook Seawolves baseball

America East Regular season Champions America East tournament Champions Coral Gables Regional champions Baton Rouge Super Regional champions

College World Series, 7th (tie)
- Conference: America East Conference

Ranking
- Coaches: No. 8
- CB: No. 8
- Record: 52–15 (21–3 America East)
- Head coach: Matt Senk (22nd season)
- Assistant coaches: Joe Pennucci (6th season); Mike Marron (3rd season); Dave Lorber (2nd season)
- Home stadium: Joe Nathan Field

2012 America East Conference baseball standings
	Conf.						Overall
Team	W		L		T	PCT	W		L		T	PCT
No. 8 Stony Brook ‍†‍‡‍^{y}	21	–	3	–	0	.875	52	–	15	–	0	.776
Albany ‍‍‍	16	–	8	–	0	.667	22	–	32	–	1	.409
Binghamton ‍‍‍	13	–	9	–	0	.591	23	–	26	–	0	.469
Maine ‍‍‍	11	–	11	–	0	.500	28	–	28	–	0	.500
Hartford ‍‍‍	7	–	17	–	0	.292	16	–	40	–	0	.286
UMBC ‍‍‍	2	–	22	–	0	.083	10	–	42	–	0	.192
† – Conference champion ‡ – Tournament champion y – Invited to the 2012 NCAA Division I baseball tournament As of June 17, 2012; Rankings from Coaches' Poll

The 2012 Stony Brook Seawolves baseball team represented Stony Brook University in the 2012 NCAA Division I baseball season. The Seawolves were coached by 22nd-year head coach Matt Senk and played their home games at Joe Nathan Field. The Seawolves clinched their second consecutive regular season championship and their fourth America East Conference baseball tournament championship, earning the league's automatic bid to the 2012 NCAA Division I baseball tournament, their fourth appearance in school history.

In the NCAA tournament, the team went on to win the Coral Gables Regional. They then defeated LSU in the Baton Rouge Super Regional, becoming the first ever team from the America East Conference to advance to the College World Series, the first team from New York in thirty years, and the first team from the Northeast since 1986.

== Summary ==
=== Regular season ===
Stony Brook opened their 2012 campaign with a perfect 4–0 weekend at Thibodaux, Louisiana, with pair of victories over Alabama State and Nicholls State in the Colonel Round Robin. The team then traveled to Greenville, North Carolina, to face off against East Carolina, where they were swept in three consecutive one-run games to drop their record to 4–3. They returned to the Northeast for a single game against Fairleigh Dickinson, routing the Knights at Teaneck, New Jersey. Stony Brook participated in the Dairy Queen Classic splitting the weekend against Kansas and host Minnesota, bringing their record to 7–5.

Stony Brook opened their home season on March 10 against Iona beating the Gaels 12–7. The Seawolves followed up beating the Yale Bulldogs three out of four in a weekend series and compiled a string of victories against Fordham and Columbia for their first five-win streak of the season. Stony Brook couldn't keep the pace and lost back-to-back games against Holy Cross but bounced back to win a pair of games against NYIT and victories against Marist and Fairleigh Dickinson, ending their non-conference slate at 17–8.

The Seawolves opened conference play against Binghamton, taking two of three at home. The team won two midweek non-conference games against Iona and Marist at home and then traveled to Albany for a weekend series; the Seawolves took three out of four. The team returned home to beat Rhode Island 8–2 and swept a four-game series against Hartford. Stony Brook played a pair of midweek non-conference games against Fairfield and Central Connecticut, coming out victorious on both occasions and swept a four-game series at UMBC, extending their winning streak to ten games and taking command of first place in the America East with a 34–10 overall record and 12–2 conference record.

Stony Brook took two out of three against Binghamton at home and swept a three-game series against UMBC to clinch a second consecutive regular season championship while going 21–2 at home. Stony Brook closed the regular season with a four-game sweep at conference rival Maine to win a program record 43 games. They ended the regular season with a 43–11 record, going 21–3 in the America East. The Seawolves headed into the conference tournament with the best winning percentage in Division I.

=== America East tournament ===
Stony Brook earned a first-round bye in the America East tournament, hosted at Joe Nathan Field. Needing to win three games to earn the conference title, they defeated fourth-seeded Maine 14–6 and third-seeded Binghamton 7–4 to advance to the title game, where they met up with Maine again, defeating them 13–6 to advance to the 2012 NCAA Division I baseball tournament with a 46–11 record, the best record in Division I with an .807 winning percentage. The Seawolves were the first team in the America East since 2002 to earn both the regular season and conference tournament championships in the same season. For the first time in the history of the program, Stony Brook found itself ranked, sitting at #25 in the Baseball America poll and #29 in the NCBWA poll.

=== Coral Gables Regional ===
Stony Brook traveled to South Florida to play in the Coral Gables Regional as the fourth seed. In the first game the Seawolves knocked off top seeded Miami (FL) by a score of 10–2. The Hurricanes had not lost a regional home opener since 1978. After losing to UCF 9–8, the Seawolves entered the loser's bracket, where they defeated Missouri State 10–7, mounting a comeback after being down four runs in the seventh inning and striking out Luke Voit with the bases loaded in the bottom of the ninth to preserve the victory. This gave the Seawolves a spot in the regional championship, where they defeated UCF 12–5 and 10–6 in consecutive days to win the regional, advancing to face LSU in the Super Regionals.

=== Baton Rouge Super Regional ===
In the first game of the Baton Rouge Super Regional, LSU started freshman Aaron Nola while Stony Brook started sophomore Brandon McNitt. While Nola departed with a 2–0 deficit, the Tigers came back to tie in the bottom of the ninth on a solo shot by JaCoby Jones. Stony Brook put together leads in the top of the 10th and 11th innings, but LSU tied the game both times with solo home runs. A rain delay in the 12th inning postponed the game, set to restart at 10:05 a.m. on the next day. A single by Mason Katz in the bottom of the 12th gave LSU a 5–4 walk-off victory.

In game two of the Super Regional, LSU started Kevin Gausman, who had been drafted in the top 5 of the 2012 MLB draft a week prior. Gausman had closed out game one earlier in the day. Stony Brook's senior pitcher Tyler Johnson threw a 127-pitch complete game as the Seawolves defeated the Tigers 3–1. In the winner-take-all game three, Stony Brook jumped out to an early lead and handily won 7–2 behind sophomore pitcher Frankie Vanderka's complete game. The improbable upset sent Stony Brook to the College World Series, the first Northeast school to do so since 1986 and the first school from New York to do so since St. John's in 1980.

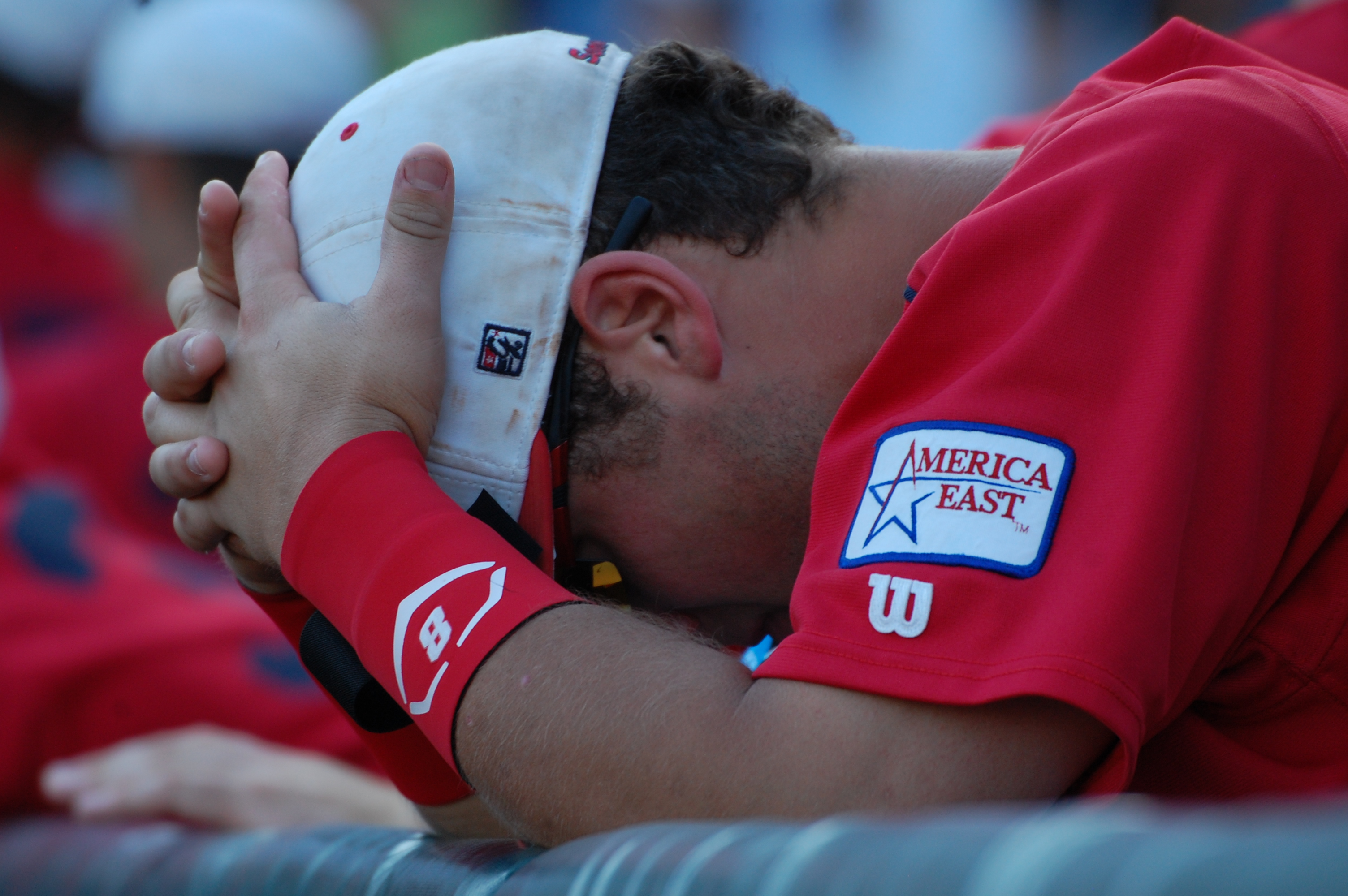
A Seawolves player reacts as Stony Brook is eliminated from the World Series.

=== College World Series ===
After upsetting LSU in Baton Rouge, Stony Brook took on the motto "Shock The World" to represent their unlikely run to the College World Series. Stony Brook found itself ranked #7 in NCBWA poll, their highest ranking ever, and Matt Senk was later announced to be the National Coach of Year. In the College World Series, Stony Brook suffered consecutive losses, falling 9–1 to UCLA and 12–2 to Florida State to end the Seawolves' Cinderella run. They finished the season 52–15, the most wins by any Division I team in 2012, with a program record seven drafted players.

== Roster ==
2012 Stony Brook Seawolves baseball team
Players
Coaches

#	Pos.	Name	B/T	Height	Weight	Year	Home town
1	C	Anthony Italiano	R/R	5 ft 9 in (1.75 m)	185 lb (84 kg)	So	Sayville, New York
2	C	Kevin Krause	R/R	6 ft 2 in (1.88 m)	190 lb (86 kg)	Fr	Staten Island, New York
3	C	Pat Cantwell	R/R	6 ft 1 in (1.85 m)	205 lb (93 kg)	Fr	West Islip, New York
4	OF	Michael Hubbard	R/R	6 ft 2 in (1.88 m)	180 lb (82 kg)	So	Northridge, California
5	INF	William Carmona	S/R	6 ft 0 in (1.83 m)	220 lb (100 kg)	Jr	Hempstead, New York
6	OF	Travis Jankowski	L/R	6 ft 3 in (1.91 m)	190 lb (86 kg)	Jr	Lancaster, Pennsylvania
7	INF	Gabriel Pena	R/R	5 ft 9 in (1.75 m)	156 lb (71 kg)	So	Bronx, New York
8	INF	Maxx Tissenbaum	L/R	5 ft 11 in (1.8 m)	191 lb (87 kg)	Jr	Toronto, ON, Canada
9	LHP	Josh Barry	L/L	5 ft 10 in (1.78 m)	160 lb (73 kg)	So	Seaford, New York
11	INF	Luke Alba	R/R	5 ft 0 in (1.52 m)	190 lb (86 kg)	Fr	Downington, Pennsylvania
12	RHP	Evan Stecko-Haley	R/R	6 ft 5 in (1.96 m)	185 lb (84 kg)	Sr	Coral Springs, Florida
14	OF	Sal Intagliata	R/R	6 ft 2 in (1.88 m)	210 lb (95 kg)	Sr	Franklin Square, New York
15	RHP	James Campbell	R/R	6 ft 1 in (1.85 m)	195 lb (88 kg)	Jr	Bridgeport, Connecticut
16	OF	Steven Goldstein	L/L	5 ft 11 in (1.8 m)	175 lb (79 kg)	Fr	East Meadow, New York
17	INF	Michael Roehrig	L/L	6 ft 2 in (1.88 m)	190 lb (86 kg)	Fr	Lindenhurst, New York
19	INF	Bryan Tatelman	R/R	6 ft 1 in (1.85 m)	180 lb (82 kg)	So	South Windsor, Connecticut
20	RHP	Brandon McNitt	R/R	5 ft 10 in (1.78 m)	170 lb (77 kg)	So	Chino Hills, California
23	RHP	Frankie Vanderka	R/R	6 ft 2 in (1.88 m)	205 lb (93 kg)	So	Levittown, New York
24	OF	Tanner Nivins	R/R	5 ft 10 in (1.78 m)	195 lb (88 kg)	Jr	Kitchener, ON, Canada
25	INF	Kevin Courtney	L/L	6 ft 1 in (1.85 m)	195 lb (88 kg)	So	Lindenhurst, New York
26	OF	Joshua Mason	R/R	6 ft 2 in (1.88 m)	180 lb (82 kg)	So	Woodland Hills, California
27	RHP	Jasvir Rakkar	R/R	6 ft 2 in (1.88 m)	200 lb (91 kg)	Jr	Brampton, ON, Canada
28	INF	Cole Peragine	S/R	5 ft 11 in (1.8 m)	170 lb (77 kg)	Fr	Belle Ewart, ON, Canada
30	RHP	Nick Brass	R/R	6 ft 2 in (1.88 m)	190 lb (86 kg)	Fr	Shirley, New York
32	RHP	Matt Gallup	R/R	5 ft 10 in (1.78 m)	160 lb (73 kg)	Fr	Albany, New York
33	LHP	G.C. Yerry	L/L	6 ft 1 in (1.85 m)	195 lb (88 kg)	Jr	West Shokan, New York
41	LHP	Zachary Uher	L/L	6 ft 4 in (1.93 m)	210 lb (95 kg)	So	Freeport, New York
44	RHP	Tyler Johnson	R/R	6 ft 0 in (1.83 m)	180 lb (82 kg)	Sr	Chatsworth, California

Head coach

Matt Senk

Assistant coach(es)

Joe Pennucci
Mike Marron
Dave Lorber

Legend

- (C) Team captain
- (S) Suspended
- (I) Ineligible
- Injured
- Current redshirt

Roster
Last update: June 11, 2012

== Schedule ==
2012 Stony Brook Seawolves baseball game log
Regular season (43–11)
February (4–0)

#	Date	Rank	Opponent	Site/stadium	Score	Win	Loss	Save	Attendance	Overall record	AEC Record
1	February 24		Alabama State (Colonel Round Robin)	Ray E. Didier Field	W 3–2	Vanderka (1–0)	Estevez (0–1)	None	300	1–0	–
2	February 24		Nicholls State (Colonel Round Robin)	Ray E. Didier Field	W 8–6	McNitt (1–0)	Webster (1–1)	Rakkar (1)	400	2–0	–
3	February 25		Alabama State (Colonel Round Robin)	Ray E. Didier Field	W 6–0	Stecko (1–0)	Frost (0–2)	None	200	3–0	–
4	February 26		Nicholls State (Colonel Round Robin)	Ray E. Didier Field	W 4–1	Campbell (1–0)	Wisecarver (0–1)	Vanderka (1)	307	4–0	–

March (10–4)

#	Date	Rank	Opponent	Site/stadium	Score	Win	Loss	Save	Attendance	Overall record	AEC Record
5	March 2		East Carolina	Clark–LeClair Stadium	L 0–1	Brandt (2–1)	Johnson (0–1)	Reynolds (4)	2262	4–1	–
6	March 3		East Carolina	Clark–LeClair Stadium	L 1–2	Merritt (1–1)	McNitt (1–1)	Reynolds (5)	2123	4–2	–
7	March 4		East Carolina	Clark–LeClair Stadium	L 3–4	Cotton (2–0)	Stecko-Haley (1–1)	Merritt (1)	2138	4–3	–
8	March 7		Fairleigh Dickinson	Naimoli Family Baseball Complex	W 17–5	Gallup (1–0)	Paz (0–1)	None	139	5–3	–
9	March 9		Kansas (Dairy Queen Classic)	H.H.H. Metrodome	W 4–0	Johnson (1–1)	Taylor (1–2)	None	N/A	6–3	–
10	March 9		Kansas (Dairy Queen Classic)	H.H.H. Metrodome	L 1–3	Kahana(2–0)	Rakkar (0–1)	None	110	6–4	–
11	March 10		Minnesota (Dairy Queen Classic)	H.H.H. Metrodome	L 1–7	Oakes (4–0)	Stecko-Haley (1–2)	None	N/A	6–5	–
12	March 11		Minnesota (Dairy Queen Classic)	H.H.H. Metrodome	W 5–4	Rakkar (1–1)	Kray (0–1)	Carmona (1)	250	7–5	–
13	March 14		Iona	Joe Nathan Field	W 12–7	Brass (1–0)	Leon (0–1)	None	225	8–5	–
14	March 17		Yale	Yale Field	W 2–1 ^{(F/11)}	Mason (1–0)	Fortunato (0–1)	None	225	9–5	–
15	March 17		Yale	Yale Field	L 0–1	Shultz (1–0)	Vanderka (1–1)	None	225	9–6	–
16	March 18		Yale	Yale Field	W 13–2	Stecko-Haley (2–2)	Becker (0–2)	None	–	10–6	–
17	March 18		Yale	Yale Field	W 10–0	Rakkar (2–1)	Hickey (1–2)	None	245	11–6	–
18	March 20		Fordham	Houlihan Park	W 11–2	Gallup (2–0)	Reich (0–2)	None	189	12–6	–
19	March 23		Columbia	Robertson Field	W 6–5	McNitt (2–1)	Olson (1–3)	Mason (1)	–	13–6	–
20	March 23		Columbia	Robertson Field	W 11–10	Mason (2–0)	Spinosa (0–4)	Rakkar (2)	231	14–6	–
21	March 25		Holy Cross	Fitton Field	L 1–3	Marra (2–1)	Vanderka (1–2)	None	125	14–7	–
22	March 25		Holy Cross	Fitton Field	L 3–5	Colella (3–1)	Rakkar (2–2)	None	102	14–8	–

April (20–2)

#	Date	Rank	Opponent	Site/stadium	Score	Win	Loss	Save	Attendance	Overall record	AEC Record
23	April 1		NYIT	Joe Nathan Field	W 6–0	Johnson (2–1)	Dillabough (0–3)	None	–	15–8	–
24	April 1		NYIT	Joe Nathan Field	W 10–1	Stecko-Haley (3–2)	Bulva (0–2)	None	225	16–8	–
25	April 4		Fairleigh Dickinson	Joe Nathan Field	W 9–0	Tatelman (1–0)	MacDonald (0–1)	None	125	17–8	–
26	April 6		Binghamton	Joe Nathan Field	W 2–1 ^{(F/8)}	Johnson (3–1)	Augliera (2–4)	None	–	18–8	1–0
27	April 6		Binghamton	Joe Nathan Field	W 9–2	McNitt (3–1)	Lynch (2–3)	Vanderka (2)	310	19–8	2–0
28	April 7		Binghamton	Joe Nathan Field	L 2–5	Lambert (2–3)	Stecko-Haley (3–3)	Sosa (3)	205	19–9	2–1
29	April 10		Iona	Joe Nathan Field	W 10–3	Rakkar (3–2)	Nargoski (2–4)	None	175	20–9	–
30	April 11		Marist	Joe Nathan Field	W 14–5	Gallup (3–0)	Zlotnick (0–2)	None	115	21–9	–
31	April 14		Albany	Varsity Field	W 9–2	Johnson (4–1)	Graham	None	143	22–9	3–1
32	April 14		Albany	Varsity Field	W 13–3	McNitt (4–1)	Lucas	None	66	23–9	4–1
33	April 15		Albany	Varsity Field	W 6–4	Campbell (2–0)	Kraham	Mason (2)	173	24–9	5–1
34	April 16		Albany	Varsity Field	L 6–7 ^{(F/10)}					24–10	5–2
35	April 18		Rhode Island	Joe Nathan Field	W 8–2	Yerry (1–0)				25–10	–
36	April 20		Hartford	Joe Nathan Field	W 7–5					26–10	6–2
37	April 20		Hartford	Joe Nathan Field	W 6–0					27–10	7–2
38	April 21		Hartford	Joe Nathan Field	W 4–0					28–10	8–2
39	April 21		Hartford	Joe Nathan Field	W 9–4					29–10	9–2
40	April 24		Central Connecticut	Joe Nathan Field	W 4–3					30–10	–
41	April 25		Fairfeld	Alumni Baseball Diamond	W 6–4					31–10	–
42	April 28		UMBC	The Baseball Factory Field at UMBC	W 5–0					32–10	10–2
43	April 28		UMBC	The Baseball Factory Field at UMBC	W 13–6					33–10	11–2
44	April 29		UMBC	The Baseball Factory Field at UMBC	W 17–1					34–10	12–2

May (9–1)

#	Date	Rank	Opponent	Site/stadium	Score	Win	Loss	Save	Attendance	Overall record	AEC Record
45	May 5		Binghamton	Joe Nathan Field	W 3–0					35–10	13–2
46	May 5		Binghamton	Joe Nathan Field	L 1–3					35–11	13–3
47	May 6		Binghamton	Joe Nathan Field	W 8–0					36–11	14–3
48	May 12		UMBC	Joe Nathan Field	W 6–5					37–11	15–3
49	May 12		UMBC	Joe Nathan Field	W 21–8					38–11	16–3
50	May 13		UMBC	Joe Nathan Field	W 7–6					39–11	17–3
51	May 18		Maine	Mahaney Diamond	W 5–1					40–11	18–3
52	May 18		Maine	Mahaney Diamond	W 5–4					41–11	19–3
53	May 19		Maine	Mahaney Diamond	W 7–2					42–11	20–3
54	May 19		Maine	Mahaney Diamond	W 10–9					43–11	21–3

Postseason (9–4)
America East Tournament (3–0)

#	Date	Rank	Opponent	Site/stadium	Score	Win	Loss	Save	Attendance	Overall record	AECT Record
55	May 23	(1)	(4) Maine	Joe Nathan Field	W 14–6					44–11	1–0
56	May 24	(1)	(3) Binghamton	Joe Nathan Field	W 7–4					45–11	2–0
57	May 25	(1)	(4) Maine	Joe Nathan Field	W 13–6					46–11	3–0

NCAA tournament: Coral Gables Regional (4–1)

#	Date	Rank	Opponent	Site/stadium	Score	Win	Loss	Save	Attendance	Overall record	NCAAT Record
58	June 1	(4)	(1) No. 22 Miami (FL)	Alex Rodriguez Park	W 10–2	Johnson (10–1)	Erickson (8–6)		1,247	47–11	1–0
59	June 2	(4)	(2) No. 21 UCF	Alex Rodriguez Park	L 8–9	Matulis (7–0)	McNitt (8–3)	Rogers (13)	1,275	47–12	1–1
60	June 3	(4)	(3) Missouri State	Alex Rodriguez Park	W 10–7	Vanderka (2–2)	Burgess (5–2)	Campbell		48–12	2–1
61	June 3	(4)	(2) No. 21 UCF	Alex Rodriguez Park	W 12–5	Rakkar (6–2)	Skoglund (5–3)	Mason (3)	926	49–12	3–1
62	June 4	(4)	(2) No. 21 UCF	Alex Rodriguez Park	W 10–6	Johnson (11–1)	Adkins (3–6)		710	50–12	4–1

NCAA tournament: Baton Rouge Super Regional (2–1)

#	Date	Rank	Opponent	Site/stadium	Score	Win	Loss	Save	Attendance	Overall record	NCAAT Record
63	June 8–9	No. 16	(7) No. 1 LSU	Alex Box Stadium	L 4–5^{(F/12)}	Gausman (12–1)	Vanderka (2–3)		11,207	50–13	4–2
64	June 9	No. 16	(7) No. 1 LSU	Alex Box Stadium	W 3–1	Johnson (12–1)	Gausman (12–2)		11,468	51–13	5–2
65	June 10	No. 16	(7) No. 1 LSU	Alex Box Stadium	W 7–2	Vanderka (3–3)	Eades (5–3)		11,976	52–13	6–2

NCAA tournament: College World Series (0–2)

#	Date	Rank	Opponent	Site/stadium	Score	Win	Loss	Save	Attendance	Overall record	CWS Record
66	June 15	No. 7	(2) No. 4 UCLA	TD Ameritrade Park	L 1–9	Plutko (12–3)	Johnson (12–2)		21,662	52–14	0–1
67	June 17	No. 7	(3) No. 3 Florida State	TD Ameritrade Park	L 2–12	Compton (12–2)	McNitt (8–4)		22,112	52–15	0–2

== Professional draftees ==
Stony Brook had a program-record seven players drafted by Major League Baseball teams in the First-Year Player Draft. Travis Jankowski was selected in the supplemental first round, 44th overall by San Diego, Stony Brook's first ever first-round draftee. Pat Cantwell, who was drafted previously in 2011, was drafted in the third round by the Texas Rangers. Maxx Tissenbaum (11th Round, San Diego), William Carmona (11th Round, Philadelphia), James Campbell (12th Round, Los Angeles Dodgers), Jasvir Rakkar (26th Round, Chicago), and Tyler Johnson (33rd Round, Oakland) were also drafted and all signed professional contracts with their respective teams.

== Rankings ==
Ranking movements Legend: ██ Increase in ranking ██ Decrease in ranking — = Not ranked
	Week																		
Poll	Pre	1	2	3	4	5	6	7	8	9	10	11	12	13	14	15	16	17	Final
Coaches'	—	—*	—	—	—	—	—	—	—	—	—	—	—	—	—	—	—	—	8
Baseball America	—	—	—	—	—	—	—	—	—	—	—	—	—	—	—	25	—	—	7
Collegiate Baseball^	—	—	—	—	—	—	—	—	—	—	—	—	—	—	—	—	16	7	8
NCBWA†	—	—	—	—	—	—	—	—	—	—	—	30	—	—	30	29	18	7	8

^ Collegiate Baseball ranked 40 teams in their preseason poll, but only ranked 30 teams weekly during the season.
† NCBWA ranks 30 teams in their preseason poll, but only ranks 25 teams weekly during the season.
* A new poll was not released for this week, so for comparison purposes, the previous week's ranking is inserted in this week's slot.

There are no Baseball America or Coaches' Polls for weeks 15 and 16, during the NCAA tournament.

== See also ==
- Cinderella (sports)
