= 2012 America East Conference baseball tournament =

American college baseball tournament

- Teams: 4
- Format: Double-elimination
- Finals site: Joe Nathan Field; Stony Brook, NY
- Champions: Stony Brook (4th title)
- Winning coach: Matt Senk (4th title)
- MVP: James Campbell (Stony Brook)

2012 America East Conference baseball standings
	Conf.						Overall
Team	W		L		T	PCT	W		L		T	PCT
No. 8 Stony Brook ‍†‍‡‍^{y}	21	–	3	–	0	.875	52	–	15	–	0	.776
Albany ‍‍‍	16	–	8	–	0	.667	22	–	32	–	1	.409
Binghamton ‍‍‍	13	–	9	–	0	.591	23	–	26	–	0	.469
Maine ‍‍‍	11	–	11	–	0	.500	28	–	28	–	0	.500
Hartford ‍‍‍	7	–	17	–	0	.292	16	–	40	–	0	.286
UMBC ‍‍‍	2	–	22	–	0	.083	10	–	42	–	0	.192
† – Conference champion ‡ – Tournament champion y – Invited to the 2012 NCAA Division I baseball tournament As of June 17, 2012; Rankings from Coaches' Poll

The 2012 America East Conference baseball tournament took place from May 23 through 25. The top four regular season finishers of the league's six teams met in the double-elimination tournament held at Stony Brook University's Joe Nathan Field. Stony Brook won their fourth America East Championship, defeating Maine 13–6 in the championship game, and earned the conference's automatic bid to the 2012 NCAA Division I baseball tournament.

== Seeding ==
The top four finishers from the regular season will be seeded one through four based on conference winning percentage only. They then played a double-elimination format. The top seed played the fourth seed while the second and third seeds faced off in the first round.

Team	W	L	Pct.	GB	Seed
Stony Brook	21	3	.875	–	1
Albany	16	8	.667	5	2
Binghamton	13	9	.591	8	3
Maine	11	11	.500	10	4
Hartford	7	17	.292	14	–
UMBC	2	22	.084	19	–

== Results ==
Upper round 1
1	Stony Brook	14
4	Maine	6
2	Albany	1
3	Binghamton	2
Lower round 1
4	Maine	8
2	Albany	3

Upper final
1	Stony Brook	7
3	Binghamton	4
Lower final
3	Binghamton	1
4	Maine	5

Final
1	Stony Brook
4	Maine

== All-Tournament Team ==
The following players were named to the All-Tournament Team.

Player	Team
Travis Jankowski	Stony Brook
Pat Cantwell	Stony Brook
Maxx Tissenbaum	Stony Brook
James Campbell	Stony Brook
Fran Whitten	Maine
Ian Leisenheimer	Maine
Mike Connolly	Maine
Mike Augliera	Binghamton
Jay Lynch	Binghamton
Nolan Gaige	Albany

=== Most Outstanding Player ===
James Campbell was named Most Outstanding Player. Campbell was a pitcher for Stony Brook.
