= Killing machine =

Killing machine may refer to:

== Film ==
- The Killing Machine, English language title for Shorinji Kempo a 1975 Japanese action film with Sonny Chiba, Hiroyuki Sanada and Etsuko Shiomi
- The Killing Machine, a 1994 Canadian thriller film with Jeff Wincott and Michael Ironside
- Icarus (2010 film), also known as The Killing Machine, an action film by Dolph Lundgren

== Music ==
- Killing Machine, the UK title of Hell Bent for Leather by Judas Priest
  - "Killing Machine" (Judas Priest song), the title song of the UK version
- Killing Machine, a 2008 EP by Kill Switch...Klick
- "Killing Machine", a song by Alec Empire from Intelligence and Sacrifice
- "Killing Machine", a song by Destruction from Inventor of Evil

== Other uses ==
- The Killing Machine, a 1964 science fiction novel by Jack Vance

== See also ==
- Killing (disambiguation)
- Machine (disambiguation)
