= Lancaster Catholic High School =

Location
- 650 Juliette Avenue; Lancaster, (Lancaster County), Pennsylvania 17601; United States; 40.0576°N 76.296°W

Information
- Type: Private, coeducational
- Motto: "Cor Sapiens Quaerit Doctrinam" (A Wise Heart Seeks Knowledge)
- Religious affiliation: Catholic
- Established: 1929
- School district: Diocese of Harrisburg
- President: Kyla Hockley
- Principal: Sean Van Eman
- Chaplain: Father T. Meinert
- Faculty: Approx. 72
- Grades: 9-12
- Enrollment: 500 (2025)
- Colors: Purple and gold
- Athletics conference: Lancaster/Lebanon League
- Mascot: Crusader
- Nickname: LCHS
- Team name: Crusaders
- Accreditation: Middle States Association of Colleges and Schools
- Newspaper: Rambler
- Yearbook: Rosmarian
- Tuition: $15,750
- Athletic Director: Nate Leonard
- Director of Fine & Performing Arts: Tony Brill
- Website: http://www.lchsyes.org

Lancaster Catholic High School is a Catholic co-educational high school located in Lancaster, Pennsylvania, United States. It is part of the Roman Catholic Diocese of Harrisburg secondary schools.

== Academics ==
Timothy Hamer has been the school's president while Terry Klugh has been principal since the departure of Thomas S. Fertal. The administration is traditionally structured with a vice principal and dean of students (discipline).

The school is coeducational and runs on a traditional quarter system. As a parochial school, LCHS requires all students to take one credit (full-year course) of religious study for each year of their duration at the school. LCHS offers levels of classes including general, academic, honors and AP classes on a minimum college-prep level.

=== GPA weighting ===
Classes are weighted according to academic challenge: Foundations classes (4.0 scale), College Prep classes (4.5 scale), Honors (5.0 scale), and AP (5.5 scale).

== Good Samaritan Program ==
Service is an integral part of the educational process at Lancaster Catholic High School. The Good Samaritan Program was established by James Rogers for all students to foster the proclamation of the Gospel, and to form good habits of service to others. The program is promoted with two goals in mind: first, to help fulfill the needs of many community and civic organizations, as well as churches and parishes, who rely on volunteer hours to accomplish many of their own goals; and second, to give all students at Lancaster Catholic High School an opportunity to be of service to the Church, school, and community.

Each student, as approved by Lancaster Catholic High School Board policy, is required to perform 20 hours of non-remunerated (no salary or wages) service to school, church, or community per year. Accredited service must be performed at an approved location or have the approval of the Director of Service.

== Athletics ==
LCHS is a member of the Lancaster-Lebanon League as part of the Pennsylvania Interscholastic Athletic Association primarily competing in Section 4 (Section 1, 2 or 3 in some sports). Richard Hinnenkamp is the school's athletic director.

=== PIAA sports ===
- Men's/women's basketball
- Men's/women's soccer
- Men's/women's track and field
- Men's/women's cross country
- Men's/women's swimming/diving
- Men's/women's tennis
- Men's golf (open to women)
- Men's bowling (open to women)
- Men's wrestling
- Men's football
- Men's baseball
- Women's softball
- Women's field hockey
- Women's/men's cheerleading
- Women's volleyball (co-op with Lancaster Country Day School)

==== Football ====
Beginning in 1950 when the LCHS football team posted a 7-1-1 record and won the Central Penn Catholic Football League Championship, to the Edward Maley and Ben Charles (USC) guided 1956 Central Penn Catholic Football League Championship team which compiled a 10-0 record and the days of James Paul (1961–64) the first alumnus to play in the NFL with the Denver Broncos, there has been a tradition of excellence when it comes to the football program.

In 1974, LCHS, led by Phil Kirchner and Bob Gramola, won the highly competitive Tri-County Football League Championship. This was the last championship until a group of athletes under the guidance of Coach Joe Mack and linebacker Tom Burger (Duke), Chris Hogarth (William and Mary), Steve France (Ohio State), and Eric Baumgardner (Syracuse), to mention a few, returned the team to glory in the 1980s. The 1982 team won the inaugural District III AA title, and the 1983 team won a second consecutive title. That team beat a Bishop McDevitt team led by James Bryant (Ohio State), Sean Barowski (Penn State), and future NFL running back Ricky Watters (ND) 7-6.

In 1998, the team won a Section III title under the guidance of Coach Tony DiPaolo, whose 156-97-6 record over a twenty-five-year coaching career makes him the winningest football coach in school history. After returning to the gridiron in 1993, DiPaolo stepped down in 2001. His teams consistently fronted strong defensive squads.

In 2003, Bruce Harbach took over the Crusader football program. Through the 2009 season, his overall record stands at 78-23. During his tenure as head coach, the Crusaders have appeared in the District 3 AA playoffs five straight years. His teams appeared in four of the last five District 3 AA Championship games from 2004–08, taking home two gold medals in 2005 and 2008. The Crusaders made their first ever state playoff appearance in 2005, and in 2008 they advanced to the Eastern Finals and state semi-finals, losing to Philadelphia West Catholic. The Crusaders have won four straight Lancaster/Lebanon League Section 3 titles, went undefeated in the regular season in 2005 and 2006 (10-0), and set school records by recording the most wins in a season during the 2008 campaign, at 13-2. Harbach has been named Lancaster/Lebanon League Section 3 Coach of the Year by his peers three times (2005, 2006, and 2007). Lancaster Catholic won 24 regular season games from 2004 to 2007. The Crusaders have won 34 of 35 Section 3 L/L League games and have finished in the top 10 in the state rankings in the past five years in the state's AA classification. In 2009, the Crusaders compiled a 15-1 record, losing only to Manheim Central in week 3. The team went on to claim the PIAA State AA Championship at Hersheypark Stadium in a driving snowstorm by defeating Greensburg Central Catholic 21-14. Quarterback Kyle Smith and wide receiver Tyler Purvis were named to the all-state AA first team, with K Geoffrey Arentz and halfback Jordan Stewart capturing second team honors. The state title marked the first in the history of Lancaster Catholic's storied program. In 2011, the team compiled a perfect 16-0 record en route to another PIAA AA State Championship. In 2012, the team moved from AA to AAA for PIAA competitions.

==== Baseball ====
- Section 4 Champions 2000, 2001, 2008, 2009, 2010, 2012, 2013, 2015, 2016, 2017, 2018, 2019, 2021, 2022, 2023
- Lancaster-Lebanon League Finalists 2012, 2013, 2017
- Lancaster-Lebanon League Champions 2013, 2017
- PIAA District 3 Playoff Appearances 19
- PIAA District 3 Finalists 1989, 2008, 2016, 2017, 2018, 2022
- PIAA District 3 Champions 2008 (AA) 2017, 2018, 2022 (AAA)
- PIAA State Tournament Qualifiers 1989, 2008, 2016, 2017, 2018, 2022
- PIAA Class AAA State Champions 2018

Lancaster Catholic's varsity baseball program has enjoyed tremendous success since the start of the new century.

The baseball program was initiated at Catholic High in the spring of 1975. Stumpf Field served as the home of Crusader baseball for that first season and many thereafter. In 1989, the program saw its first major advance into the postseason. Head Coach Craig Kirchoff led his team to three District 3 Class AA tournament victories and the first-ever Championship appearance for the program: a 10-2 thumping at the hands of Oley Valley, the eventual State Champion. The 1989 squad also saw the first state tournament action for the program, enduring a 2-0 loss to District 11 Champion Northwestern Lehigh. That year, the team finished 12-12 and the program would not see sustained success until its rise to prominence in the early 2000s.

From 2003 to 2007, Mike Hoffman was the head coach for the Crusaders. Before retiring from the game, Hoffman led his last team to a District 3 Class AA semifinal appearance in the spring of 2007. He compiled a record of 53 wins and 53 losses during his time with the program. With Hoffman's departure, former JV coach Mike Davis would take the reins for a two-year stint (2008–2009).

Under Head Coach Mike Davis, the Crusaders won their first-ever District 3 Class AA Championship in 2008 with a five-inning, 15-5 mercy-rule drubbing of Brandywine Heights. The team then won its first state tournament game with a 7-4 victory over District 1 Champion New Hope-Solebury. In the quarterfinal round of the state tournament, the 2008 squad ultimately fell 3-2 to District 4 Champion (and eventual State Champion) Loyalsock Township, finishing with an 18-7 record.

Davis' former assistant Chris Kiehl led the program for the next five years (2010–2014). The assemblage and maturation of some of the finest ball-players to ever compete at Catholic High fell under Kiehl's charge. In 2012, he guided the team to its first-ever Lancaster-Lebanon League Championship, though they were stunned by Section 4 rival Pequea Valley in a 4-3 defeat. The 2012 squad finished with a 20-5 record, which included a 10-game win streak and an appearance in the District 3 Class AAA quarterfinal round: a 7-4 loss to eventual State Champion West York. The following year was one of redemption for the Crusaders. The 2013 team took the program to new heights by capturing its first L-L League Championship with a 9-6 victory over Hempfield. In the process of winning the League title, the Crusaders rattled off 12 consecutive victories and finished with a final record of 20-4, falling in the first round of the District 3 Class AAA tournament to eventual champion Greencastle-Antrim.

In 2015, the varsity program was turned over to Kiehl's former JV coach, Ty Book. In 2016, he guided the Crusaders to their first return trip to the District 3 Class AA Championship since 2008, though they lost to Oley Valley, 6-0. The 2016 squad holds the dubious distinction of losing to the eventual L-L League Champion (Solanco, 3-2, 10 innings, quarterfinal round) District Champion (Oley Valley) and State Champion (District 12 Champion Neumann-Goretti, 5-1, first round).

The 2017 season was one of historic success for the program. Piloted by Coach Book and anchored by a core group of veteran seniors, this team won the L-L League Championship for the second time in four years, with wins over Section 1 runner-up Warwick (3-1) Section 2 Champion Elizabethtown (11-1, 6 innings) and Section 3 Champion Garden Spot (11-3) who had previously won the regular season meeting between both teams by a score of 7-2. As the number two seed in the District 3 Class AAA field, Catholic High continued their "redemption playoffs" by defeating Annville-Cleona 5-1 (the same team who that year ended the Crusaders' 26-game win streak in Section 4 play) to set up a rematch with Oley Valley in the Championship. This year however, it was the Crusaders who came away with the 6-0 victory to claim the second District 3 Championship in program history. After advancing to the State Quarterfinals via a 10-0, 5 inning rout of District 12 runner-up Science Leadership Academy, the Crusaders once again fell victim to perennial power Loyalsock Township in a 6-4 defeat. The 2017 squad holds the mark for the most consecutive playoff victories earned (6) in addition to the most total games won (21) and most total games played (27).

Despite losing several key players to graduation from the year before, the underclassmen and rising seniors were determined to make the 2018 season a memorable one. Coach Book's team earned a number two District playoff seeding for a third straight year after posting a 14-4 record in the regular season. Although the hopes of repeating as L-L League Champions were dashed in a 2-0 quarterfinal loss to Lampeter-Strasburg, the Crusaders regrouped to defeat Biglerville 4-1 in the District semifinal and defended their District 3 crown by thrashing Oley-Valley 7-0 in the AAA Championship game. The games that followed would take the program into a new realm of competition…

The baseball team began the 2018 PIAA State Tournament by hammering String Theory (12-2) 16-1 in 4 innings. This was followed by a spectacular 7-0 no-hitter against Mid Valley (2-2) in the quarterfinal round. In the team's first ever State Semifinal appearance, the Crusaders trounced Montoursville (4-1) winners of 14 straight, in a stunning 7-2 victory. These successes were capped off by a solid 5-1 win against South Side (7-3) in the AAA State Championship game held at State College. In achieving the highest accomplishment for their sport, the Crusaders won 20 games and unintentionally managed not to register a single double play in any of their 25 official contests. The six playoff victories earned in 2018 were enough to tie the 2017 squad for the most in any single season for the baseball team.

Following a lackluster 13-8 campaign in 2019 and the pandemic cancelled 2020 season, the Crusaders posted a 14-7 record in 2021. They made semifinal appearances in the L-L League and District 3 AAA tournaments. Coach Book stepped down at the end of the season and 2009 alumnus Steve Remley was hired to take his role. Coach Book accumulated 101 wins against 39 losses in six seasons at the helm to make him the winningest head coach in program history. Remley is the fourth former JV coach at Catholic High to accept the varsity head coaching job.

In Remley's first year, the Crusaders turned in a dominant performance, winning more games in the regular season (18) than any previous team, and earning the top seed for the 2022 District 3 AAA tournament in the process. The fourth District Championship in program history came thereafter, along with three tremendous PIAA state tournament victories before falling 13-2 in the state title game to undefeated Central (6-1). These Crusaders set three other program records: most total wins (23) most shut-out wins (11) and achieved the highest winning percentage (.851) while tying for first or second in several other statistical categories.

The 2023 season was defined by the new L-L League section alignment where for the first time, each team would play every other team in their section three times instead of twice. By the end of the regular season, the Crusaders became the first team in the League to win all 15 section games. In doing so, they also set a program record 16 consecutive wins and achieved the 500th victory for the program. Additionally, the eighth-straight section title won this year represents the most consecutive section titles won by any sport in school history. Despite winning the quarterfinal of the L-L League tournament, the season ended ignominiously in the District quarterfinal.

The Crusaders play their home games at Riley Field. They have been named Section 4 Champions 15 times since the year 2000, and since 1999 have posted only three seasons without a winning record. Since 2010, the program has won 237 games against 103 losses for a .697 winning percentage. Numerous players have received league-wide and all-state recognition for their talents. Travis Jankowski ('09) and Chris Mattison ('12) were both drafted out of college by the San Diego Padres of the National League. Many other Crusader baseball alumni have gone on to enjoy successful collegiate baseball careers as well.

With the most recent reclassification of PIAA sports for the 2016-2017 school year, the baseball team has been reclassified as AAA (up from AA) out of the new 6-classification format (up from a 4-tier classification system).

==== Basketball ====
The boys' basketball program had varied success up until the late 1990s and the 2000s. Since the 1970s LCHS has qualified for the LL League Championships 14 times (the fourth most in league history), earned five second-place finishes (second most in league history), and captured the title in 2003. From 2000 to 2010 the program recorded nine out of 11 section championships, which included a string of seven straight, numerous District III playoff appearances with a title in 2003 and 2011 and a second-place finish in 2010. Since 2001 LCHS has qualified for the PIAA Championships seven times. The 2003 boys' basketball team posted a record of 35-0, the greatest in state history on their way to the PIAA AAA state championship. The Crusaders had previously competed at the AA level. Lancaster Catholic defeated Oxford 87-76, Allentown Central Catholic 61-57, Harriton 74-69, and Steelton-Highspire 66-60 in the PIAA playoffs, before downing Perry Traditional Academy of Pittsburgh in the finals 75-59. The 75 points was the most scored in a Class AAA championship since Pottstown beat Valley, 85-66, in 1993. Their season total of 2509 points ranked #1 in Pennsylvania in 2003. Greg Testa (Millersville University - basketball) played a big role in the win with his ballhandling and shooting, while Ryan Purvis (Boston College - football), a 6-5 junior center, made 10 of 15 shots from the field, scored 25 points and pulled down a game-high 13 rebounds.

Head Coach Bill Southward was named the state's Triple-A Coach of the Year by the Associated Press. He is the first basketball coach from Lancaster County to receive the AP's State Coach of the Year award, and he is believed to be the first county coach from any sport to earn an AP State Coach of the Year award. Southward retired after 11 years at Catholic, six as the head coach. He posted a 144-36 record. The boys' program compiled a winning streak of 46 straight games from 2002 to 2004, which is known to be in the top 20 basketball winning streaks in state history.

Led by Lamar Kauffman, who is in his 26th season at the helm of the Lady Crusaders, the girls' basketball team has seen great success and is noted as one of the premier programs in the PIAA. The team has 13 District 3 AAA championships to their credit, and the 1996 team won the PIAA state AAA title, one of three under his guidance. Kauffman is known for his high-pressure defense and intense off-season conditioning. The program boasts the most state titles of any in the school and the 1974 team which went 27-0, winning the PIAA Girls' State Basketball Championship, the first state championship title for any team sport in school history.

In 2002 Katie Hayek graduated from LCHS and became a co-captain for the University of Miami Women's Basketball team. During her four-year high school career, she became LCHS's second-leading all-time scorer, with 1,510 career points. She averaged 20.6 points, four rebounds and four assists per game her senior season and also led her team in assists and steals. She earned All-Star honors from the Intelligencer Journal, Harrisburg Patriot News and the New Era, and was named to the Pennsylvania All-State Second Team by the Associated Press in her senior year.

==== Track and field ====
The boys' track team in the 1980s under the tutelage of coaches Andy Benko, Tom Simpson, Joe Bering, and Lou Portas, posted some of the school's most impressive win records. From 1980 to 1986 the team lost just one dual meet; in 1985 it had its finest season ever, as the team captured the PIAA State championship, the first ever for LCHS's boys' track and field team. Since then their success has been down. However, in the past decade the track and field teams have captured several men's and women's section titles, and have sent competitors to the Penn Relays under Coaches Sandy Guilfoyle and Maureen McElrone. They have also repeatedly sent athletes to district and state track meets, bringing home numerous medals.

==== Wrestling ====
Current Lancaster County commissioner Scott Martin was a state champion for the Crusaders in the 1990s. Under coach Tom Vargo, from 1972-1987 the program's overall record was 184-61-3, with one Central Penn Catholic League Championship in 1974, L-L League Section II Championships in 1980 and 1981 and an L-L League Section I Co-Championship in 1983. LCHS teams won PIAA District III AAA Championships in 1982 and 1983 and a PIAA District III AA Championship in 1985. The current coach is Tom Blaszczyk.

=== Non-PIAA sports ===
The men's lacrosse team is a joint program with J.P. McCaskey High School and Lancaster Country Day High School.

Lancaster Catholic is in a CPIHL joint program with Conestoga Valley High School for men's ice hockey. The team has done well in recent years, always atop the tier 3 ladder.

== Marching unit ==
The Lancaster Catholic High School Marching Unit has excelled for well over the past decade, competing in the COB, TOB, and USSBA. Capturing first place at Atlantic Coast Championships within the Tournament of Bands several times, they have competed within the USSBA league, and took second place at their championships in 2008. They stopped competing in 2013, and now participate in showcases within the Lancaster County Marching Band Coalition.

== Parochial feeder schools ==
Lancaster Catholic draws a large portion of its student body from the local parochial school system. Additionally, the parishes of the local deanery support the financial aide efforts of LCHS to make Catholic education available to all.

- Resurrection Catholic School (Lancaster City)
- Sacred Heart Catholic School (Lancaster City)
- Our Lady of the Angels (Columbia)
- Our Mother of Perpetual Help (Ephrata)
- St John Neumann Catholic School (Lancaster)
- St. Leo the Great School (Lancaster)
- Seven Sorrows B.V.M. (Middletown)
- St. Phillip the Apostle (Millersville)
- St. Mary's (Lancaster City)

== Alma mater ==
O Catholic High, we hail thy name,
Loved guardian of our youth.
O Radiant the holy flame
That lights thy lamp of truth.
We pledge you our firm loyalty,
O Alma Mater dear.
We'll cherish, love and honor thee
And thy great name revere,
We'll cherish, love and honor thee
And thy great name revere.

Bright colors waving in the sky,
The purple and the gold;
Proud banner of dear Catholic High
For all men to behold.
We'll pledge you our firm loyalty,
O Alma Mater brave.
We'll boldly stand for purity
Where'er thy banners wave.
We'll boldly stand for purity
Where'er thy banners wave.

O Catholic High, thy name we sing
We lift our voices high,
And clear and strong let our song ring
Of love that will not die.
We pledge you our firm loyalty,
O Alma Mater true.
We vow to always honor thee
And thy great goal pursue.
We vow to always honor thee
And thy great goal pursue.

== Notable alumni ==
- Bob Swift, 1960, Canadian Football League all star and Grey Cup champion
- Vince DiCola, 1975, composer, keyboardist, and arranger, noted for movie soundtracks Rocky IV and The Transformers: The Movie
- Gary P. Gilroy, 1976, composer, arranger, music publisher, California State University Fresno Director of Bands
- Travis Jankowski, 2009, baseball player
- Kiki Jefferson, 2019, basketball player
- Scott Martin, Pennsylvania State Senator since 2017
- Ryan Purvis, 2004, Boston College tight end 2004-2008, Tampa Bay Buccaneers tight end
- Harriet Ryan, 1992, Pulitzer Prize-winning reporter for The Wall Street Journal
- James R. Stengel, 1973, former global marketing officer of Procter & Gamble and president of Jim Stengel, LLC
- Lawrence F. Stengel, 1970, United States federal judge on the United States District Court for the Eastern District of Pennsylvania
- Christopher West, 1988, theologian and author, noted for writings on the Theology of the Body
