= Mechanicus =

Mechanicus may refer to:

- Philo of Byzantium (ca. 280 BC – ca. 220 BC), also known as Philo Mechanicus, an ancient Greek engineer and writer
- Athenaeus Mechanicus, an ancient Greek author of a book on siegecraft, active 1st century BC
- Warhammer 40,000: Mechanicus, a 2018 video game

== See also ==
- Mechanic (disambiguation)
- Mechanicus Kretz' House, a historic building in Copenhagen, Denmark
