= Mechanic (disambiguation) =

A mechanic is a skilled tradesperson who uses tools to build, maintain, or repair machinery.

Mechanic, mechanical, mechanician, or mechanics may also refer to:

== Professions ==
- Mechanic, a person who uses tools to build, fix and maintain machinery
  - Aircraft Maintenance Technician, or aircraft mechanic, a person who repairs aircraft
  - Auto mechanic, a person who repairs automobiles
- Card mechanic, a card cheat who specializes in sleight-of-hand manipulation of cards
- Hit man, or mechanic
- Mechanician

== People ==
- Bill Mechanic (born 1949), American film producer
- Mechanic, the Secret Service code name for Jared Kushner

== Arts, entertainment, and media ==
- Mechanics (Aristotle), an Ancient Greek treatise on machines
- Game mechanics, constructs of rules or methods designed for interaction with the game state
- Mike + The Mechanics, British pop-rock band

== Science and technology ==
- Mechanical engineering
- Mechanics, an area of science concerned with the behaviour of physical bodies when subjected to forces or displacements
- Mechanics' Institutes, institutions established to provide adult education, particularly scientific education, to the working classes

== See also ==
- Machine (disambiguation)
- Mechanical (disambiguation)
- The Mechanic (disambiguation)
- Mechanicus (disambiguation)
- Mechanism
