= The Mechanic =

The Mechanic may refer to:

- The Mechanic (1972 film), a crime thriller film starring Charles Bronson
- The Mechanic (2011 film), a remake of the 1972 film, starring Jason Statham
- "The Mechanic" (Batman: The Animated Series), a 1993 episode of Batman: The Animated Series
- The Mechanic (Ninjago), a character in Ninjago
- "The Mechanic", a nickname of golfer Miguel Ángel Jiménez

== See also ==
- Mechanic (disambiguation)
- The Mechanik, a 2005 film starring Dolph Lundgren
