= Riichi Yokomitsu =

Japanese writer

Riichi Yokomitsu 横光 利一
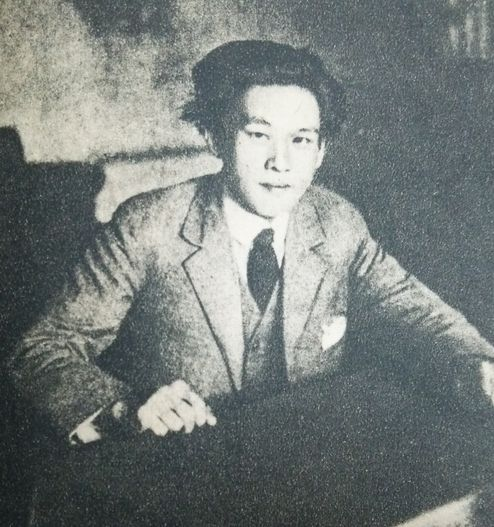
- Riichi in 1928
- Born: 17 March 1898; Higashiyama Onsen, Fukushima, Japan
- Died: 30 December 1947 (aged 49)
- Education: Waseda University
- Occupations: Novelist; short-story writer; playwright; critic; haiku poet
- Writing career
- Genre: Fiction
- Notable works: The Sun (日輪, Nichirin; 1923); The Fly (蠅, Hae; 1923); Spring Riding in a Carriage (春は馬車に乗って, Haru wa Basha ni notte; 1926); Machine (機械, Kikai; 1930); Shanghai (上海, Shanhai; 1931); Melancholy Travel (旅愁, Ryoshu; 1937–1946)

Riichi Yokomitsu (横光 利一, Yokomitsu Riichi; 17 March 1898 – 30 December 1947) was an experimental, modernist Japanese writer.

Yokomitsu began publishing in dōjinshi such as Machi ("Street") and Tō ("Tower") after entering Waseda University in 1916. In 1923, he published Nichirin ("The Sun"), Hae ("A Fly") and more in the magazine Bungeishunjū, which made his name popular. The following year he started the magazine Bungei-Jidai with Yasunari Kawabata and others. Yokomitsu and others involved in Bungei-Jidai were known collectively as the Shinkankakuha, or the New Sensation School, with a particular interest in sensation and scientific objectivity.
