= Jim Stengel =

American businessman

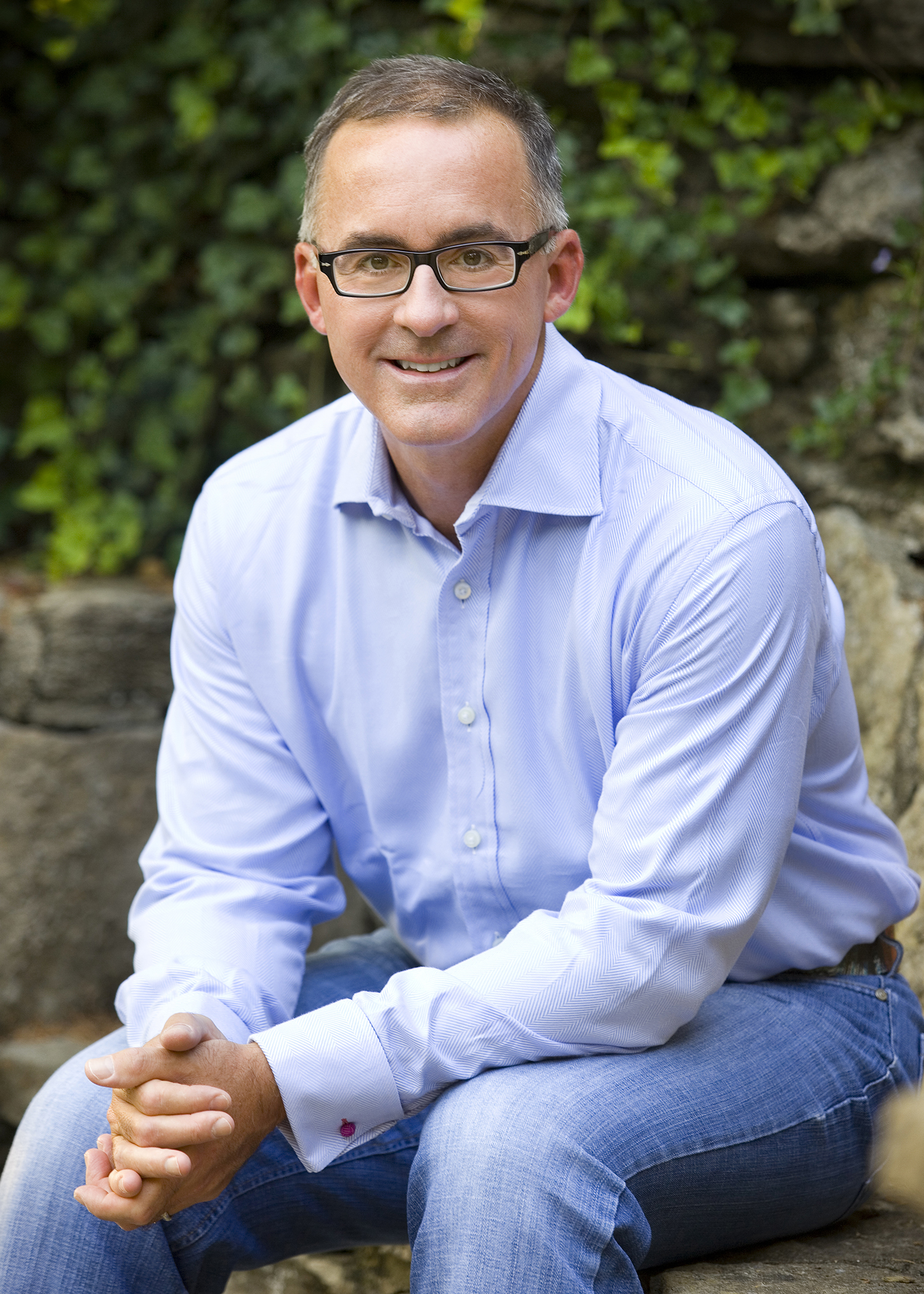
- Born: James R. Stengel; May 5, 1955 (age 71)
- Education: Franklin & Marshall College (B.A.); The Pennsylvania State University (M.B.A.)
- Occupations: President and CEO of The Jim Stengel Company, LLC Adjunct Professor of UCLA Anderson School of Management Former Global Marketing Officer of P&G (2001-2008)
- Website: www.jimstengel.com

James R. Stengel (born May 5, 1955) is an American businessman, author, professor and public speaker. He served as the global marketing officer of Procter & Gamble from 2001 to 2008. Stengel is currently the president and CEO of The Jim Stengel Company, where he advocates for ideals-driven businesses and brands. In December 2011, he released his first book, Grow: How Ideals Power Growth and Profit at the World’s Greatest Companies.

== Background ==
Jim Stengel grew up in Lancaster, Pennsylvania, in a family of six children. He graduated from Lancaster Catholic High School in 1973. He received his B.A. from Franklin & Marshall College in 1977. Stengel then spent four years (1977–1981) working for Time Inc. in the Time-Life books division. In 1983, he completed his M.B.A. from The Pennsylvania State University (Smeal College of Business).

== Procter & Gamble ==
Stengel joined Procter & Gamble (P&G) in September 1983. While there, he earned increasing responsibility in P&G’s developing markets, cosmetic, food, and baby-care businesses. Prior to his promotion to global marketing officer, Stengel held the following positions at P&G:

- 1983—Brand Assistant, Ducan Hines RTS Cookies
- 1984—Assistant Brand Manager, Jif
- 1986—Brand Manager, Jif
- 1989—Associate Advertising Manager, Jif and Duncan Hines Baking Mixes
- 1991—Advertising Manager, Shortening and Oils, Olestra
- 1993—Marketing Director, U.S. Cosmetic Products, Hunt Valley
- 1995—General Manager, Czechia and Slovakia, P&G Europe, Middle East, and Africa
- 1997—General Manager, Europe, Baby Care
- 1999—Vice President, Europe, Baby Care
- 2000—Vice President, Global Baby Care Strategic Planning, Marketing, and New Business Development

In August 2001, Jim Stengel was named the global marketing officer (GMO) of Procter & Gamble. As GMO, he oversaw an $8 billion advertising budget and had organizational responsibility for nearly 7,000 people. In his seven years as GMO, P&G doubled its sales.

In November 2008, Stengel left his role as global marketing officer at Procter & Gamble.

== The Jim Stengel Company ==
After Procter & Gamble, Stengel became president and CEO of the Jim Stengel Company, LLC.

The Jim Stengel Company is both a think tank and a consultancy. Stengel and his team are currently working with clients in tech, fashion, retail, food service, automotive, and wine/spirits.

== Books ==
In December 2011, Jim Stengel published his first book, Grow: How Ideals Power Growth and Profit at the World’s Greatest Companies, with Crown Publishing Group. A global analysis of a 10-year growth study involving 50,000 brands was conducted in partnership with Millward Brown Optimor and the UCLA Anderson School of Management. Based on this study, Jim Stengel’s book shows how the world’s 50 best businesses—The Stengel 50—have a cause-and-effect relationship between financial performance and their ability to connect with fundamental human emotions, hopes, values, and greater purposes.

Stengel published his second book with co-author Tom Post in September 2017. Unleashing the Innovators: How Mature Companies Find New Life With Startups, was published by Crown Publishing Group. The book offers valuable insight from the front lines of many Fortune 500's biggest corporations, including GE, Wells Fargo, IBM, Target, Motorola Solutions, and Toyota, all of which are learning from their alliances with startups. To support these anecdotal conclusions, Stengel commissioned a global study - the first of its kind - of 200 established companies and startups from OgilvyRED to pinpoint the opportunities, choke points, and emerging trends from these partnerships.

== Other projects ==
=== Podcast ===
In April 2019, Jim launched The CMO Podcast where he interviews a chief marketing officer from all industries in each episode.

=== Public speaking ===
Stengel is a professional speaker with the Washington Speakers Bureau. He has presented at numerous events, including the Cannes Lions International Advertising Festival and the Association of National Advertisers Conference.

=== Teaching ===
In 2009, he was appointed adjunct professor of marketing at the UCLA Anderson School of Management, and taught for four years. In 2017, Jim was appointed Senior Fellow and Adjunct Professor within the Kellogg Markets & Customers Initiative. "."

In 2011, Stengel served as dean of the first-ever Cannes Creative Academy for Young Marketers at the Cannes Lions International Festival of Creativity.

=== Advising ===
Jim is a former member of the Board of Directors for AOL and Motorola, where he chaired the Compensation & Leadership Committee. He is also a former advisory board member of MarketShare, until its sale to Neustar. Jim now serves as Chairman of the International Advisory Board for in/PACT, an interactive cause marketing firm, and serves as an Advisor for Compound, a venture capital firm. In the past, he served on the Board of The Advertising Council, and also served as Chairman of the Association of National Advertisers, and Chairman of the American Advertising Federation Hall of Fame.

=== Honors and Public Recognition ===
Jim Stengel was recognized in 2003, 2004, 2006, and 2007 by Advertising Age as the number-one “Power Player” in marketing. In 2005, he was recognized as Grand Marketer of the Year by Brandweek magazine, the same year P&G was named Marketer of the Year by Advertising Age. In 2011, Jim was named to the first-ever Fortune Executive Dream Team.
