= Mechanism =

Mechanism may refer to:

- Mechanism (economics), a set of rules for a game designed to achieve a certain outcome
  - Mechanism design, the study of such mechanisms
- Mechanism (engineering), rigid bodies connected by joints in order to accomplish a desired force and/or motion transmission
- Mechanism (biology), explaining how a feature is created
- Mechanism (philosophy), a theory that all natural phenomena can be explained by physical causes
- Mechanism (sociology), a theory that all social phenomena can be explained by the existence of a deterministic mechanism

== Arts, films, and music ==
- "The Mechanism", song by Disclosure
- "Mechanism", song by Front Line Assembly from WarMech
- The Mechanism (TV series), a Netflix TV series

== See also ==
- Machine
- Machine (mechanical)
- Linkage (mechanical)
- Mechanism of action, the means by which a drug exerts its biological effects
- Defence mechanism, unconscious mechanisms aimed at reducing anxiety
- Reaction mechanism, the sequence of reactions by which overall chemical change occurs
- Antikythera mechanism, an ancient Greek analog computer
- Theory of operation, a description of how a device or system should work
- Machine (disambiguation)
- Mechanical
- Mechanics (disambiguation)
