= Joe Nathan Field =

Baseball field in Stony Brook, New York, US

- Joe Nathan Field in 2019
- Interactive map of Joe Nathan Field
- Location: Circle Road, Stony Brook, New York, US
- Coordinates: 40.92332°N 73.122951°W
- Owner: Stony Brook University
- Operator: Stony Brook University
- Capacity: 1,000
- Surface: FieldTurf
- Scoreboard: 25 feet high
- Field size: Left Field: 330 feet (100 m); Left Center Field: 365 feet (111 m); Center Field: 390 feet (120 m); Right Center Field: 365 feet (111 m); Right Field: 330 feet (100 m)

Construction
- Opened: May 20, 2011
- Cost: $1.3 million

Tenant
- Stony Brook Seawolves (AEC) (2011–)

Joe Nathan Field is a baseball field on the campus of Stony Brook University in Stony Brook, New York, United States. The field is home to the Stony Brook Seawolves baseball team of the NCAA Division I America East Conference. It is located at the northern end of the school's athletics complex. The field opened on May 20, 2011, replacing Stony Brook's old baseball field, which was known as University Field from 2002 to 2011. The old facility was known as Seawolves Field through the 2002 season, when its name was changed to University Field.

The stadium is named after then–Minnesota Twins pitcher and Stony Brook alumnus Joe Nathan, after Nathan's $500,000 gift made extensive renovations possible. The stadium's construction cost was $1.3 million.

== History ==
In August 2008, the Joe Nathan Charitable Foundation donated $500,000 to the Stony Brook athletic department for the construction of a new baseball facility. Construction on the field took place from 2010 to 2011. Compared to the previous University Field, the dimensions of left and right field expanded from 320 to 330 feet, while center field was reduced from 410 to 390 feet, and the grass surface was replaced with FieldTurf.

The field opened on May 20, 2011, for a doubleheader against Albany. In the first game played on the field, Stony Brook defeated Albany 6–2. Nick Tropeano was the first player to pitch on Joe Nathan Field.

Joe Nathan Field has hosted the America East Conference baseball tournament in 2011, 2012, and 2021.

=== 2021 championship game controversy ===
Joe Nathan Field was typically barred from hosting the America East baseball tournament because the facility lacks lights to allow for nighttime play. However, as a result of the COVID-19 pandemic, the America East announced that the 2021 tournament would be held at the site of the regular season champion regardless of its standards, allowing for Stony Brook to host.

This ended in controversy when the America East postponed and later canceled the championship game between Stony Brook and NJIT with Stony Brook up 1–0 with the bases loaded in the bottom of the third inning. As the field lacked lights, the game could not be completed and the America East awarded NJIT the bid to the NCAA tournament, despite Stony Brook being regular season champions, because NJIT had yet to lose in the double-elimination tournament while Stony Brook had lost once. The decision resulted in significant negative backlash against the America East.

Later that year, Stony Brook athletic director Shawn Heilbron expressed a need to renovate Joe Nathan Field with a master plan completed, but needed to raise $5 million in order to make it happen.

== Gallery ==
The entrance to Joe Nathan Field

Joe Nathan Field during a Stony Brook baseball game in 2019

Joe Nathan's retired No. 22 on the bleachers of Joe Nathan Field

== See also ==
- List of NCAA Division I baseball venues
