= Mechanicus Kretz' House =

Building in Copenhagen

- Mkhanicus Kretz' Gård
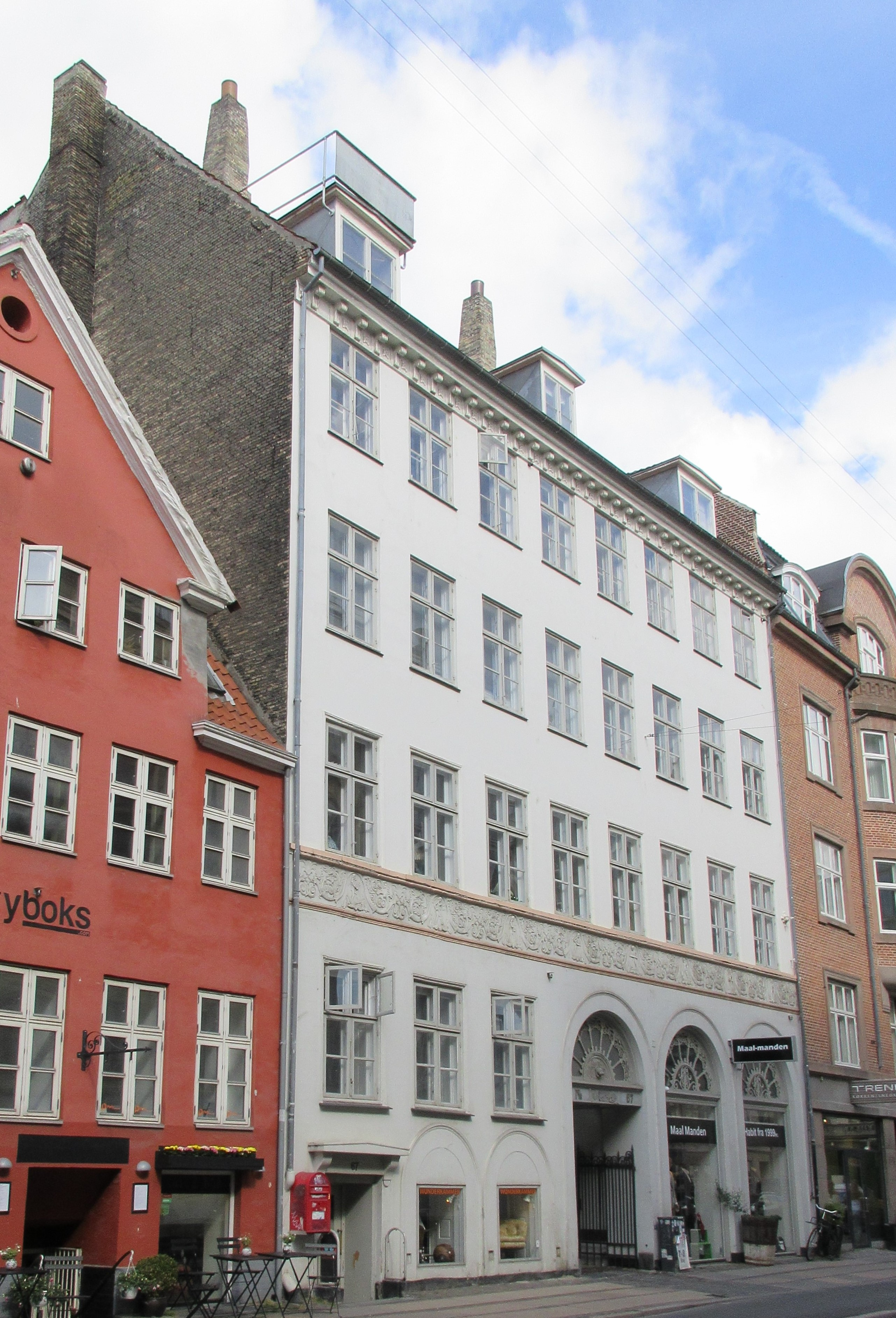
- Interactive map of the Mechanicus Kretz' House area

General information
- Architectural style: Neoclassical
- Location: Store Kongensgade 67, Copenhagen, Denmark
- Coordinates: 55°41′5.36″N 12°35′16.63″E
- Completed: 1838

Mechanicus Kretz' House (Danish: Mekanicus Kretz' Gård) is located at Store Kongensgade 67 in central Copenhagen, Denmark. The complex consists of a residential building fronting the street from the 1930s and two older rear wings. They were all listed on the Danish registry of protected buildings and places by the Danish Heritage Agency on 23 May 1973.

== History ==
=== Earlier buildings ===
The property was listed in Copenhagen's first cadastre from 1689 as No. 153 in St. Ann 'sWest Quarter, owned by skipper Peder Becher. The property was later divided into two smaller properties. They were listed in the new cadastre of 1756 as No. 57 and No. 58 om St- Ann's West Quarter. They were both owned by admiral Frederik Hoppe at that time.

In the new cadastre of 1806, both properties were listed with the same cadastral numbers as in the 1756 cadastre. No. 57 belonged to Andreas Kirkerup. No. 58 belonged to one konferensråd Nordberg.

=== Kretz and the new building ===
At the time of the 1834 census, No. 58 belonged to nmechanician Peter Johannes Kretz- He lived in the building with his wife Genofeva Blankensteiner, their nine children (aged two to 23) and two maids. His eldest son Johan Georg Kretz studied architecture at the Royal Danish Academy of Fine Arts. His second-eldest son Johan Peter Kretz studied architecture. His third-eldest son Lorentz Herman Kretz was also a student of the Royal Danish Academy of Fine Arts.

No. 57 was home to two households at the 1834 census.Christen Christensen, a Class-Lottery collector, resided in the building with his wife Kirstine Salomon and one maid. Christian Conrad Mathiesen, a lieutenant in the King's Regiment, resided in the building with his wife Cecilia Bergitte Boldt, their one-year-old foster daughter, his sister-in-law Christiane Boldt and two maids.

In 1836, No. 57 and No. 58 were merged into a single property as No. 57 & 58. The current building was constructed in 1838 by the namesake mechanicus Peter Johannes Kretz (1780 - 1851). He attended the Building School of the Royal Danish Academy of Fine Arts where he won the small silver medal in 1797 and the large silver medal in 1798. He unsuccessfully competed for the gold medal in 1900 and worked as a joiner from 1801. He married Maria Genoveva Blankensteiner (1788 - 1871) on 18 February 1808 in St. Ansgar's Church. They had 11 children. Kretz acquired the site at Store Kongensgade 67 in 1828 and as of that year worked with construction of machines ("Tischlermeister, Mechanikus und Maschinbauer"). He constructed the current building fronting the street in 1836-1838. The family lived in the ground floor (to the right) and he lived there until his death in 1851. The apartments on the other floors were let out. Count W. C. E. von Sponneck (1815-1888) was a tenant in 1842–844. Pastor Andresen operated a private school from the buildings in the courtyard (No. B og C) ifrom 1871 to 1891.

The building was listed on the Danish registry of protected buildings and places by the Danish Heritage Agency on 23 May 1973.

Borup's Society was based in the rear wing of the building.

== Architecture ==
The building fronting the street consists of four storeys and a cellar and is eight bays wide. It represents the transition from Neoclassical to the Late Classical period. The profiled frames around the windows and the arched shop windows are characteristic of the latter period. A gateway opens to the first of two successive courtyards. Two side wings project from the rear side of the building along the north and south side of the first courtyard. A two-storey building with exposed timber framing separates the two courtyards. Another two-storey building runs along the north side of the second courtyard.

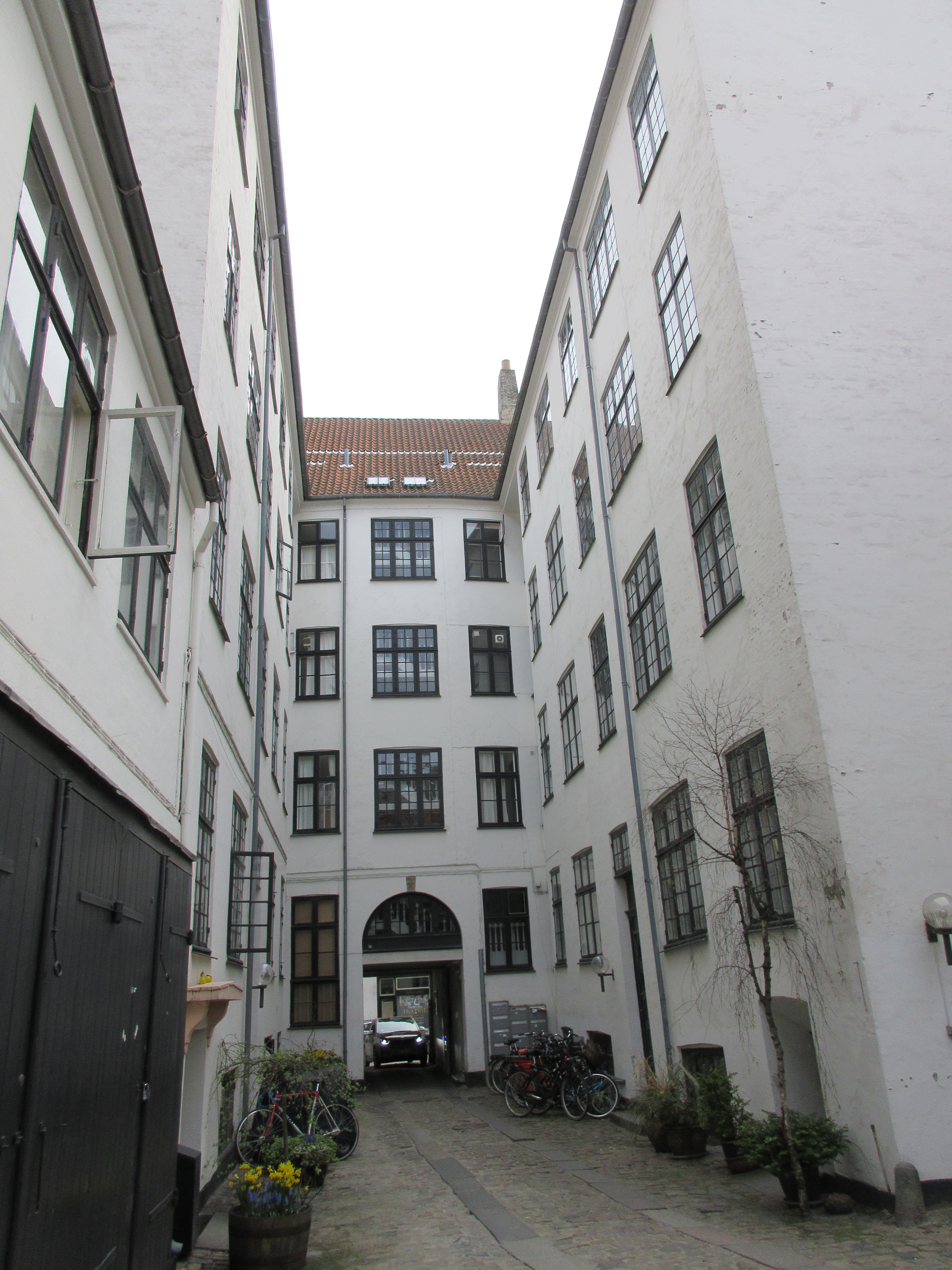
The first courtyard with the rear side of the building fronting the street

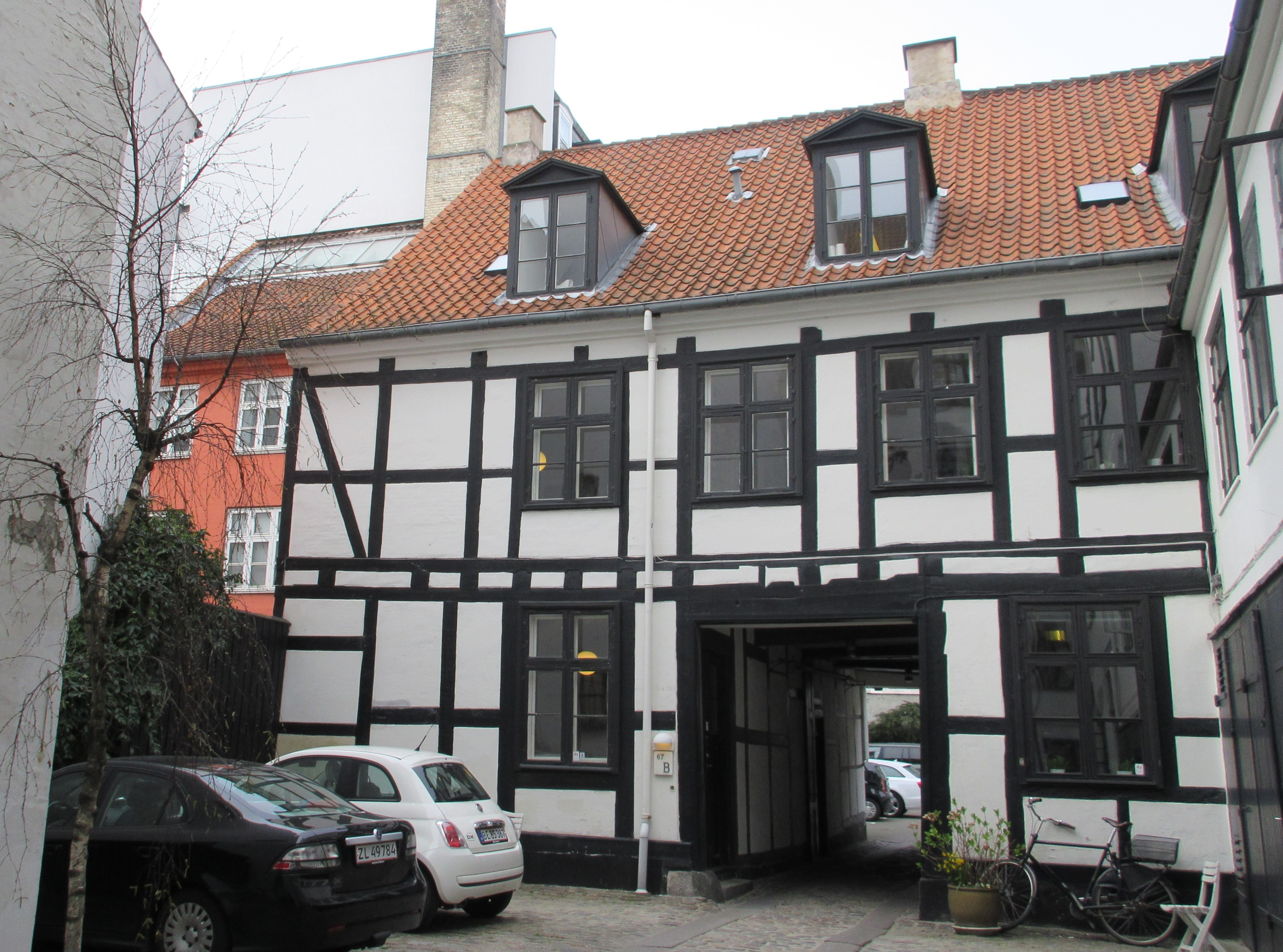
No. 56B:The building separating the two courtyards

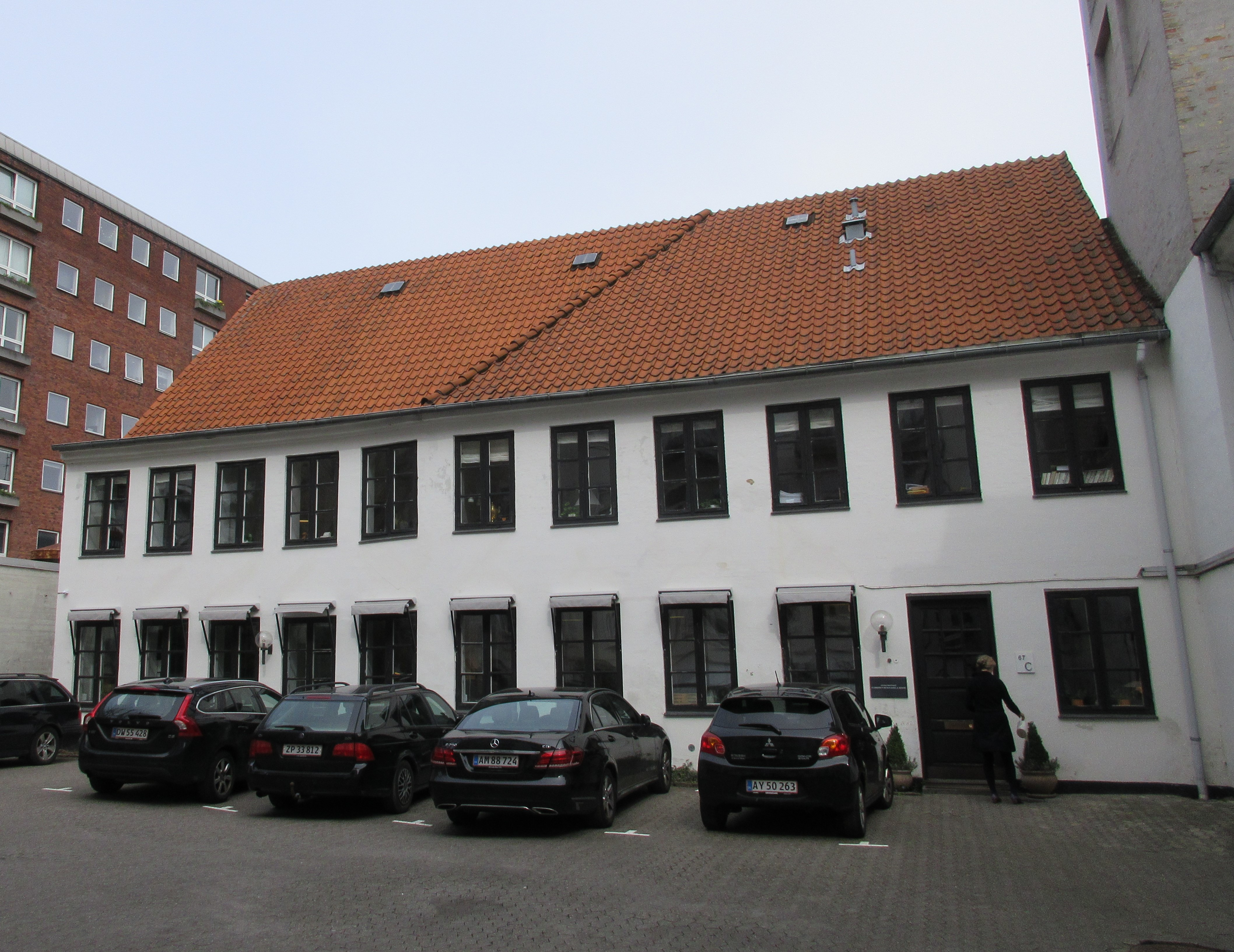
No. 67C: The building in the second courtyard

== Today ==
The building fronting the street contains apartments )ejerlejligheder). A law firm, Advokaterne Fabritius Tengnagel & Heine, os based in the rear wing at Store Kongensgade 67C.
