= AMC Machine =

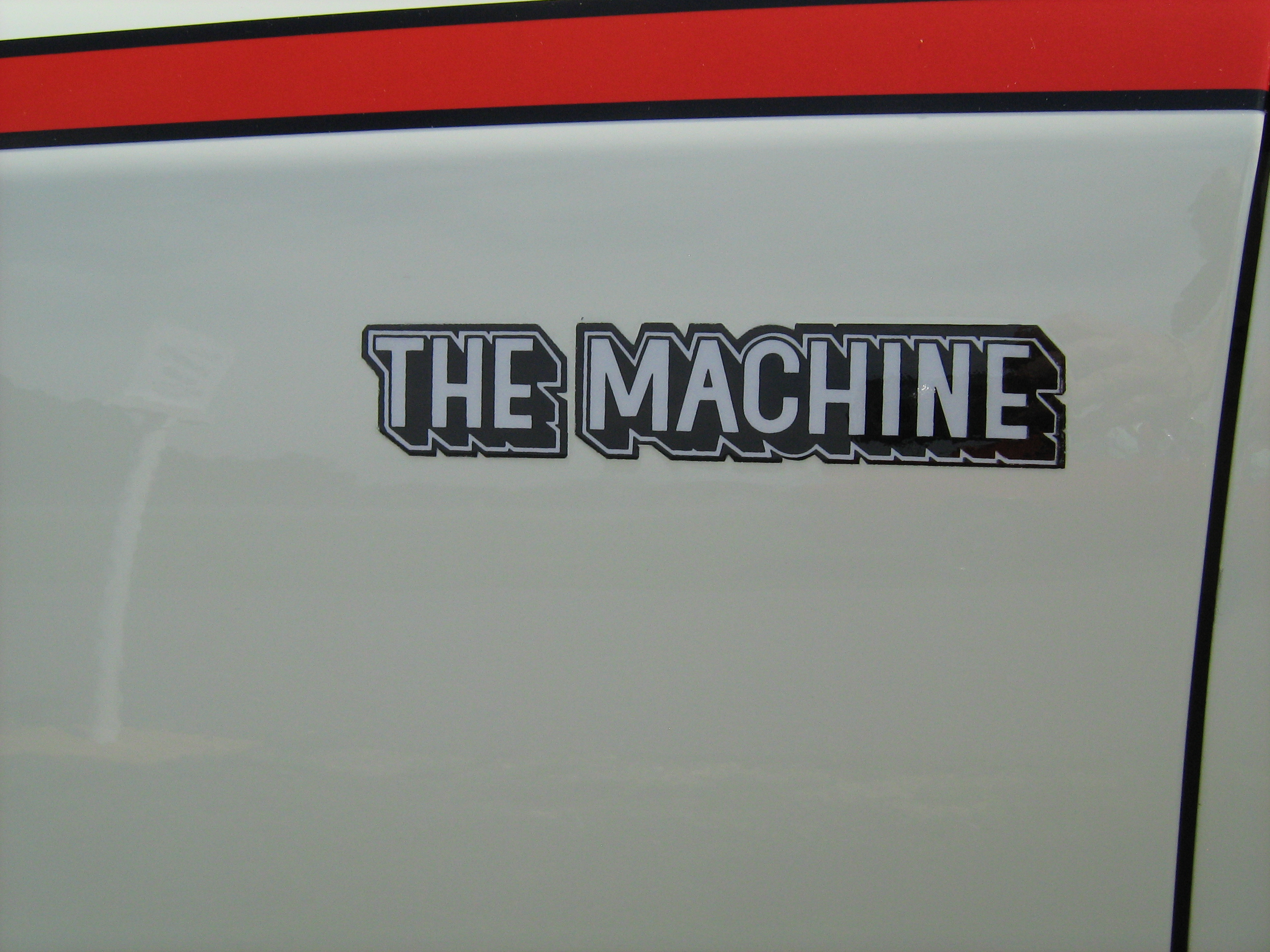
AMC's logo on the front fender

AMC Machine is an automobile nameplate applied to two vehicles built by American Motors Corporation:

- The Machine - a high-performance muscle car based on the 1970 AMC Rebel
- Matador Machine - an option package for the 1971 AMC Matador
