= Machine (nightclub) =

Defunct gay bar and nightclub in Boston, Massachusetts, U.S.

- Interactive map of Machine
- Location: Fenway–Kenmore
- Coordinates: 42.34478°N 71.09583°W
- Type: Gay bar, Nightclub

Construction
- Opened: 1998
- Closed: 2020

Machine was a gay nightclub in Boston, Massachusetts from 1998 to 2020.

== History ==
In 1998, Machine was opened in the basement of the leather and Levis gay bar, Ramrod. Machine’s presence continued a legacy of LGBTQ community in the Fenway-Kenmore neighborhood since the 1970’s.

Machine differed from the dominantly white and male-centered gay scene in Boston by catering to gay women and people of color. Machine hosted dyke nights for the sapphic community from 2007 until 2017.

Machine held weddings, memorials, and fundraisers for the gay community. The club was a popular venue for drag performances. Machine had unisex bathrooms.

In January 2020, plans to turn the nightclub building into a 15-story apartment complex were approved by the Boston Planning & Development Agency. On March 14, 2020, Machine was permanently closed.
