= Mechanical =

Mechanical may refer to:

== Machine ==
- Machine (mechanical), a system of mechanisms that shape the actuator input to achieve a specific application of output forces and movement
- Mechanical calculator, a device used to perform the basic operations of arithmetic
- Mechanical energy, the sum of potential energy and kinetic energy
- Mechanical system, a system that manages the power of forces and movements to accomplish a task
- Mechanism (engineering), a portion of a mechanical device

== Other ==
- Mechanical (character), one of several characters in Shakespeare's A Midsummer Night's Dream
- A kind of typeface in the VOX-ATypI classification

== See also ==
- Machine, especially in opposition to an electronic item
- Mechanical Animals, the third full-length studio release by Marilyn Manson
- Manufactured or artificial, especially in opposition to a biological or natural component
- Automation, using machine decisions and processing instead of human
- Mechanization, using machine labor instead of human or animal labor
- Mechanical watch, utilizing a non-electric mechanism
- Mechanical engineering, a branch of engineering concerned with the application of physical mechanics
- HVAC (heating, ventilation, and air-conditioning), the mechanical systems of a building
- Mechanical phenomenon, as in the mechanics of the Digestive Tract or the mechanics of swallowing
- Mechanical license, used in the music industry to indicate the payment made from a licensee to the owner of a copyright for the right to mechanically reproduce a song
- Mechanic (disambiguation)
- Mechanism
- Mechanics
