= Machine (novel) =

1930 novel by Riichi Yokomitsu

Machine (機械, Kikai) is a 1930 novel by the Japanese author Riichi Yokomitsu. It is one of the seminal works of modernism in Japanese literature. Set in a factory that makes metal nameplates, the story considers the effects of modern life on workers. The book's events unfold around conflicts over trade secrets kept hidden in a room in the center of the factory. Writing in 1930, Japanese literary critic Hideo Kobayashi noted that "the author of this work is not straining in the least for a new way of grasping human psychology" but concluded that the story is about "how a writer arrives at what he believes."
