= Travis Jankowski =

American baseball player (born 1991)

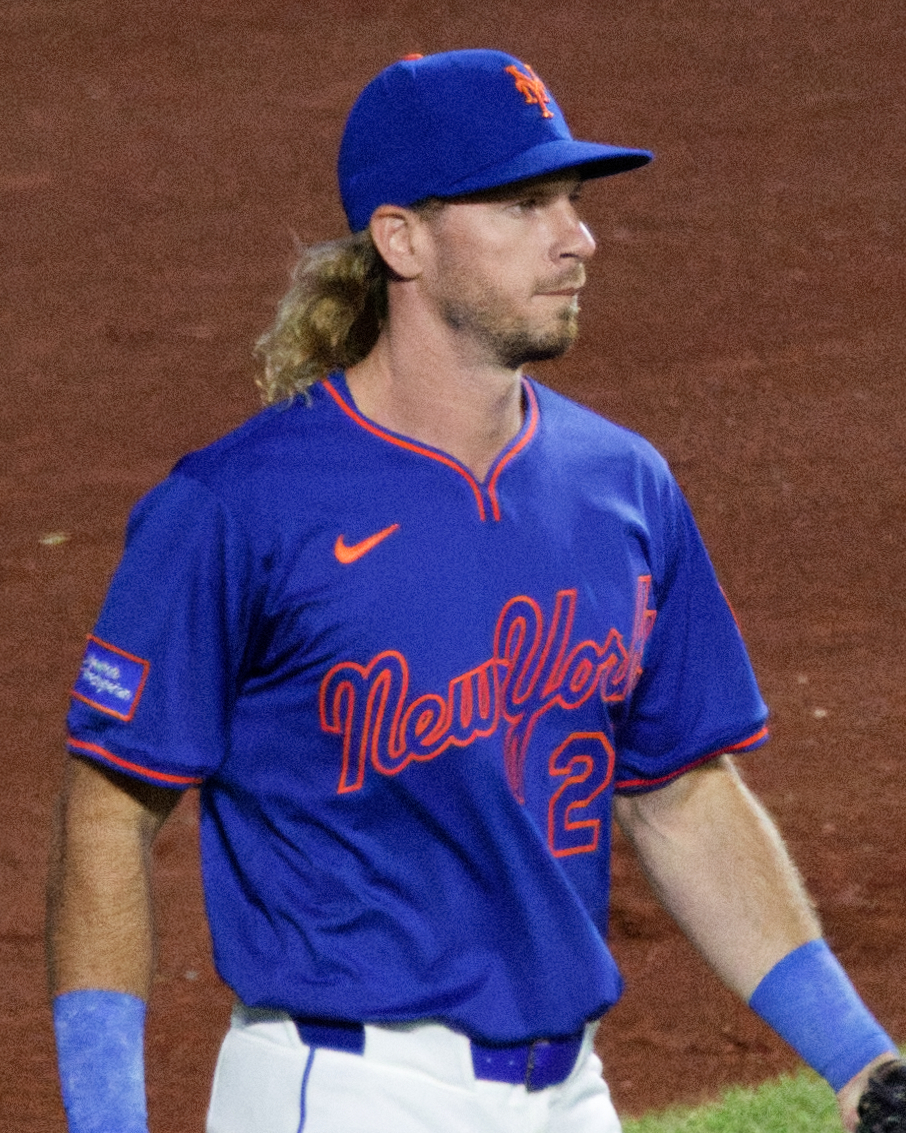
- Jankowski with the Mets in 2025

Texas Rangers – No. 96
- Outfielder / Coach
- Born: June 15, 1991 (age 35); Ephrata, Pennsylvania, U.S.
- Batted: Left Threw: Right

MLB debut
- August 21, 2015, for the San Diego Padres

Last MLB appearance
- July 8, 2025, for the New York Mets

MLB statistics
- Batting average: .236
- Home runs: 11
- Runs batted in: 98
- Stolen bases: 104
- Stats at Baseball Reference

Teams
- As player: San Diego Padres (2015–2019); Cincinnati Reds (2020); Philadelphia Phillies (2021); New York Mets (2022); Seattle Mariners (2022); Texas Rangers (2023–2024); Chicago White Sox (2025); Tampa Bay Rays (2025); New York Mets (2025); As coach: Texas Rangers (2026–present)

Career highlights and awards
- World Series champion (2023)
Medals
Men's baseball
Representing United States
Pan American Games
Silver medal – second place	2015 Toronto	Team

Travis Paul Jankowski (born June 15, 1991) is an American professional baseball first base coach and former outfielder. He is currently the first base coach for the Texas Rangers of Major League Baseball (MLB). He played in MLB for the San Diego Padres, Cincinnati Reds, Philadelphia Phillies, New York Mets, Seattle Mariners, Rangers, Chicago White Sox, and Tampa Bay Rays.

Jankowski was born and raised in Lancaster, Pennsylvania. He attended Stony Brook University, where he led the Seawolves to a Cinderella appearance in the 2012 College World Series after upsetting the LSU Tigers. As a junior, Jankowski led college baseball in hits, runs scored and triples. That same year, the Padres selected him in the first round of the 2012 MLB draft.

As he rose through the Padres' farm system, Jankowski developed an offensive style of play that favored base stealing. He made his MLB debut in 2015. In his first full season the following year, he led the Padres with 30 stolen bases. He missed significant time to injuries over the next few years and was traded to the Reds following the 2019 season. Jankowski served as the fourth outfielder for the Phillies in 2021 and the Mets in 2022. He had a one-game stint with the Mariners after the Mets released him midseason.

Jankowski signed with the Rangers in 2023 and led the team in stolen bases en route to the franchise's first-ever World Series championship. Following a season-ending injury to Adolis García in the World Series, Jankowski started in his place and had a multi-hit, multi-RBI showing in the Rangers' Game 4 win.

== Early life ==
Jankowski was born on June 15, 1991, in Lancaster, Pennsylvania. His mother, Kelly, played softball, while his father, Paul, was an outfielder for Indiana University of Pennsylvania. Jankowski and his older brother, Tyler, were both coached by their father from a young age. In addition to weight training before school in the morning and team practice in the afternoon, Jankowski would practice batting by hitting into a net that his father built in their basement. As a Pennsylvania native, Jankowski and his family grew up supporting the Philadelphia Phillies of Major League Baseball (MLB).

While attending Lancaster Catholic High School, Jankowski played on both the baseball team, as an outfielder, and on the gridiron football team, as a wide receiver. He battled a series of injuries during his high school career, including a collarbone fracture, a concussion, and a sprained ankle. Nevertheless, during his junior season, Jankowski had a .471 batting average, with 25 runs scored, 20 runs batted in (RBIs), and 24 stolen bases. The Associated Press named him to the All-State First Team that season, and he helped take Lancaster Catholic to a district championship.

== College career ==
Following his high school graduation in 2009, Jankowski committed to play college baseball at Stony Brook University on a partial athletic scholarship. Jankowski's slender frame, standing at 6 feet 2 inches (1.88 m) and 165 pounds (75 kg), made him a more appealing candidate for college baseball than football, and Stony Brook was the only NCAA Division I university to offer him a scholarship. Jankowski made his college baseball debut in the second game of the Stony Brook 2010 baseball season, scoring two hits in two at bats against Akron. His first collegiate RBI came shortly afterwards, against Alabama. On March 20, 2010, Jankowski scored the go-ahead run in the eighth inning of a 3–2 victory over Iona, running home on a wild pitch from Matt Petro. Later that season, he scored the game-winning run in a 3–2 extra innings game against Albany. Defensively, his performance in center field against North Carolina State helped take Stony Brook to its first ever NCAA tournament win. Jankowski finished his freshman season with a .262 average and 20 runs in 47 games, including 23 starts. He also led the team in stolen bases, with 13 in 14 attempts.

The summer between his freshman and sophomore year, Jankowski played collegiate summer baseball with the Marion Bobcats of the Kitty League. In 40 games with them, he led the league with a .484 batting average, 62 hits, and 45 stolen bases. Later in the summer, he was invited to play for the Bourne Braves of the Cape Cod Baseball League. In 26 at bats with Bourne, Jankowski scored five runs for a .346 average. He returned to Stony Brook as a sophomore in 2011, starting 53 games in center field. In 115 chances, Jankowski did not make a single error. Offensively, he set a school record for most stolen bases in one season, with 30 in 34 attempts, and he was 14th among all college baseball players in the nation for stolen bases. His .355 batting average was the second-highest in the America East Conference. At the end of the year, Jankowski was named to the All-America East First Team and the American Baseball Coaches Association (ABCA) All-Northeast Region second team. He was invited to rejoin the Bourne Braves in 2011, where his run production increased dramatically. Whereas Jankowski had no RBIs for the Braves in 2010, he scored 14 in the first half of the 2011 season. At the end of the season, he was named the CCBL's Most Valuable Player, leading the league with 57 hits, 31 runs scored, and seven triples, and was named to the league's Hall of Fame in 2025.

2012 proved to be a breakout season for Jankowski, who was named a preseason All-American by Baseball America and Perfect Game USA. Throughout the regular season, he led the nation in hits, runs scored, and triples, and was within the top 10 in batting average and stolen bases. In the postseason, Jankowski served as the Seawolves' leadoff hitter during their Cinderella run to the 2012 College World Series (CWS). He scored four hits in Stony Brook's 7–2 victory over Louisiana State to take the Baton Rouge Super Regional and reach the CWS. The team's run came to an end in the CWS opener, when UCLA trounced Stony Brook 9–1. Nevertheless, Stony Brook coach Matt Senk was named national Coach of the Year, and Jankowski became Stony Brook's first ever, first round MLB draft pick when he was drafted 44th overall by the San Diego Padres in the supplemental first round of the 2012 MLB draft. Jankowski was inducted into the Stony Brook Hall of Fame in 2017.

== Professional career ==
=== San Diego Padres (2012–2019) ===
==== Minor leagues ====
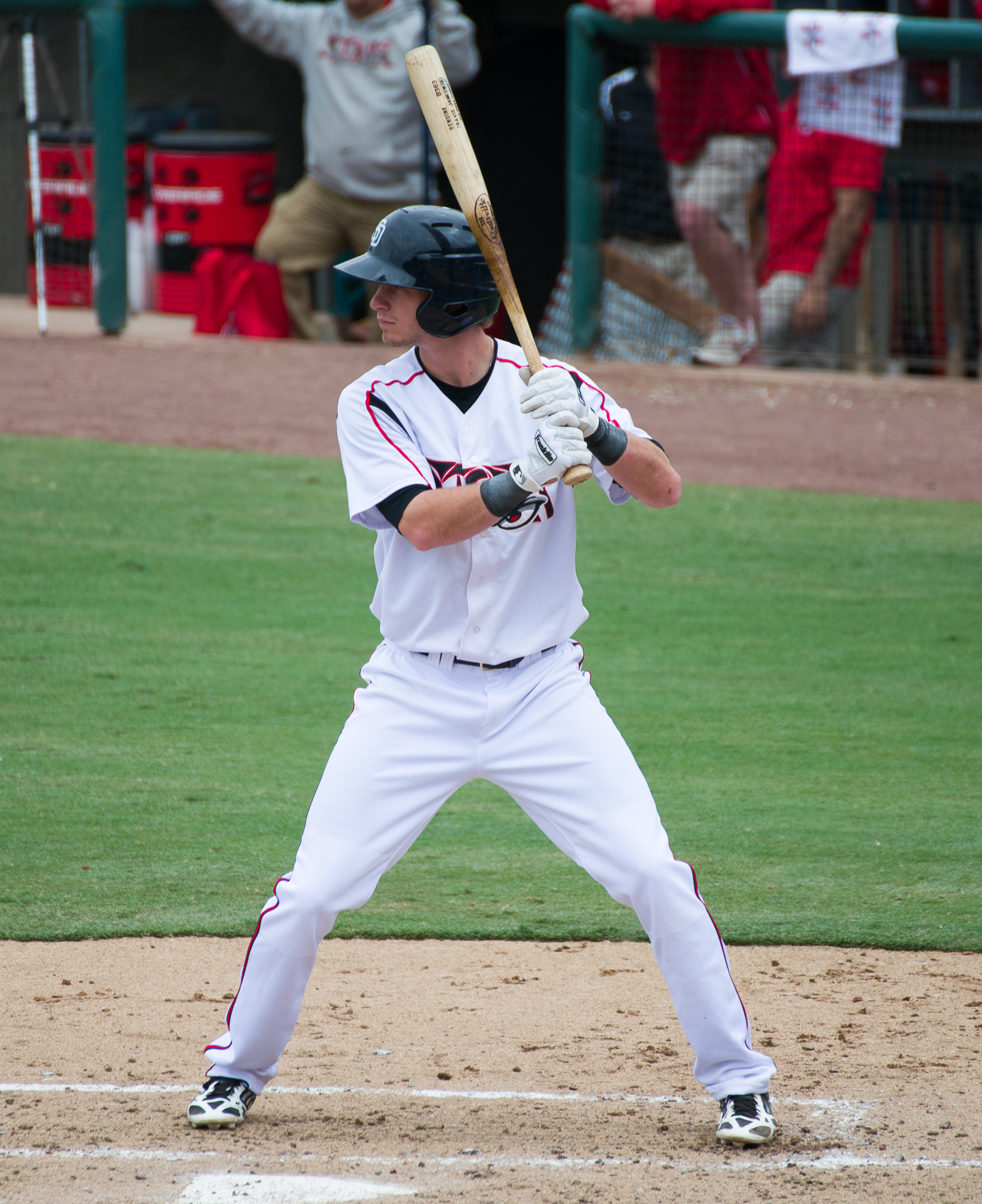
Jankowski with the Lake Elsinore Storm in 2013

The San Diego Padres selected Jankowski 44th overall in the 2012 MLB draft. He was the first of four Stony Brook players selected in that year's MLB draft, and the only outfielder. Jankowski, taken in the first round, was the highest MLB draft pick for the America East Conference since Carlos Peña, who attended Northeastern, was selected 10th overall in 1998. He and fellow Stony Brook player Maxx Tissenbaum both signed with the team on June 27, 2012, with Jankowski taking a signing bonus of $975,000.

After signing, Jankowski was assigned to the rookie-level Arizona League Padres. After only two games, in which he went two for eight and scored four RBI, the Padres promoted Jankowski to the Single-A Fort Wayne TinCaps of the Midwest League. Jankowski took some time within his rookie season of Minor League Baseball to find his stride, but began to settle into a rhythm by August, improving both his batting average and stolen base record, and he ended the regular season with a 17-game hitting streak. Jankowski appeared in the postseason for the TinCaps as well, driving in two runs against Noah Syndergaard, then pitching for the Lansing Lugnuts. In the second game of the Midwest League championship series against the Wisconsin Timber Rattlers, Jankowski was hit by a pitch in his first at-bat, fracturing his rib. He attempted to stay in the game, but was replaced by Mike Gallic at the end of the inning. On September 15, Jankowski was officially placed on the disabled list, effectively ending his rookie season. At the time, his hitting streak had been extended to 23 games, the longest in TinCaps history. In 256 plate appearances, Jankowski batted .282 for Fort Wayne, with one home run and 23 RBI, and he stole 17 bases in 59 games.

Jankowski entered the 2013 season as the Padres' No. 21 prospect, as decided by Baseball America. He was assigned to the High-A Lake Elsinore Storm of the California League, where he continued to develop his base-stealing abilities. Through mid-August, Jankowski led all professional baseball players in the United States with 71 stolen bases for the season; internationally, only Freddy Guzmán, who was playing at the time for the Delfines del Carmen of the Mexican League, had more. On August 18, Jankowski suffered a sprained ankle in a swimming pool, ending his season early. In 556 plate appearances for Lake Elsinore, Jankowski batted .286, with one home run and 38 RBI. That September, he was named a California League Postseason All-Star.

The following year, Jankowski was assigned to the Double-A San Antonio Missions. After a strong start to the season, hitting .254 in his first 67 at bats, Jankowski fractured his wrist by running headlong into the outfield fence while in pursuit of a fly ball. He underwent surgery for the injury, which fractured his elbow as well as his wrist, and, after a series of rehab assignments, returned to San Antonio for 10 games in August. Limited to only 46 minor league games in 2014, Jankowski batted .236, with 15 RBIs and 27 runs scored in 165 at bats. Jankowski later admitted that he had pushed himself too hard to return to the field in 2014, and that he continued to hone his technique the following offseason so that he could enter 2015 at full strength. He returned to Double-A in 2015, where he impressed manager Jamie Quirk in the outfield through a series of impressive catches, earning the nickname "Secretary of Defense". In late July, after hitting .316 with 23 stolen bases, Jankowski was promoted to the Triple-A El Paso Chihuahuas of the Pacific Coast League. In 24 games there, he hit .392, with nine stolen bases and eight extra-base hits.

==== Major leagues ====
Ahead of the September roster expansion, the Padres called Jankowski up in mid-August, serving as both an immediate replacement for Will Venable, who had been traded to the Texas Rangers, and as a possible future center field option to replace likely trade target B. J. Upton. Jankowski made his major league debut on August 22, 2015, batting ninth in the order against the St. Louis Cardinals. He singled in his first two at bats, joining John Sipin and Wiki González as the third Padre in franchise history to record hits in his first two major league plate appearances. He also became the first Padre since Tony Gwynn to record two hits and an RBI in his debut game. The 9–3 victory ended up becoming the Padres' 500th win at their home stadium of Petco Park. Jankowski's first major league home run came the following month, knocking in three runs against the San Francisco Giants on September 13. Those would be the only runs scored by the Padres that day, in an eventual 10–3 loss. In his first year in the major leagues, Jankowski batted .211 in 90 at bats, with two home runs and 12 RBIs, and stole two bases in 34 games.

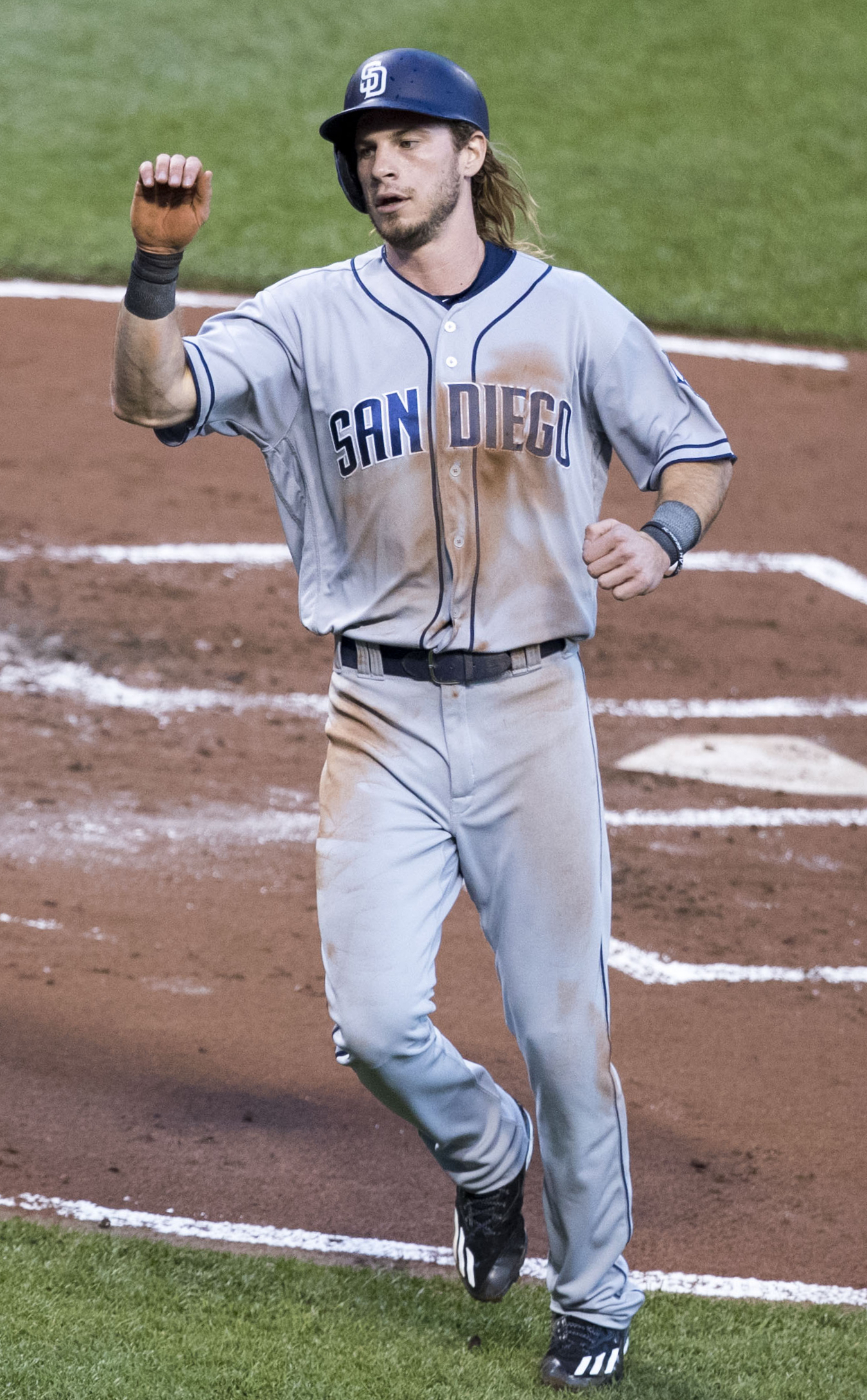
Jankowski with the Padres in 2016

In 2016, Jankowski was selected to the Padres' 25-man Opening Day roster out of spring training. For the first part of the season, he was primarily used as a pinch hitter, with a handful of outfield appearances late in the game. After starting center fielder Jon Jay suffered a fractured forearm on June 19 when he was hit by a pitch from Gio González, Jankowski was called up from the bench to start in center field. As an everyday player, he continued to impress with his frequent base-stealing. Jankowski stole home plate twice that August. First, on August 1, Wil Myers placed himself in a rundown situation as a distraction, allowing Jankowski to run home in the eighth inning of a 7–3 win over the Milwaukee Brewers. Then, on August 10, he broke for home in the eighth inning of a 4–0 victory over the Pittsburgh Pirates, and was called safe when Pittsburgh catcher Eric Fryer missed the throw to home plate. In addition to his base stealing, Jankowski's 24-game hitting streak between July 31 and August 26 was the longest by a Padres rookie since Roberto Alomar in 1988. Jankowski batted .245 for the season in 383 plate appearances, with two home runs and 12 RBIs, and he stole 30 bases in 131 games.

Going into the 2017 season, Jankowski was in competition for the center field position from prospect Manuel Margot. Margot's strong spring training performance, combined with continued injuries to regular left fielder Alex Dickerson, pushed Jankowski to left field when the season opened. On April 14, Jankowski took a foul pitch off of his left foot in a game against the Atlanta Braves. He played seven games after the injury, during which his batting average dropped to .160, and CT scans later revealed that the injury, which was originally believed to be a bone bruise, was actually a fracture to the navicular bone. Jankowski began rehab assignments in July, and was optioned to the Chihuahuas as his recovery continued. After the conclusion of their playoff run, Jankowski was called back up to the Padres in September for their final 10 games of the season. He acknowledged that the injury continued to affect him at the plate even after his return, as he doubted his ability to outrun plays with the ease that he could in years prior. Making only 87 plate appearances for the Padres that year, Jankowski batted .187, with one RBI and four stolen bases in 27 games.

Jankowski began the 2018 season with the Chihuahuas, but was recalled to the Padres at the end of April, after Myers suffered an oblique strain in a game against the New York Mets. Jankowski, who admitted to being frustrated with his minor league assignment, made an immediate impact in the major leagues. On May 19, he went 3-for-5 against the Pirates, stealing two bases in the process, and making a diving catch in the ninth inning to end the game. Statcast predicted that the game-ending play had only a 25% chance of being caught. Jankowski, who honed his batting technique with the Chihuahuas hitting coach before his call-up, became the leadoff hitter for the Padres, where he could focus on getting on base and making contact with good pitches. On August 12, in a 9–3 win over the Philadelphia Phillies, Jankowski became the first Padre to steal four bases in a single game since Everth Cabrera in 2012. He finished the season with a .259 average, including 4 home runs and 17 RBIs, in 387 plate appearances, as well as 24 stolen bases in 117 games.

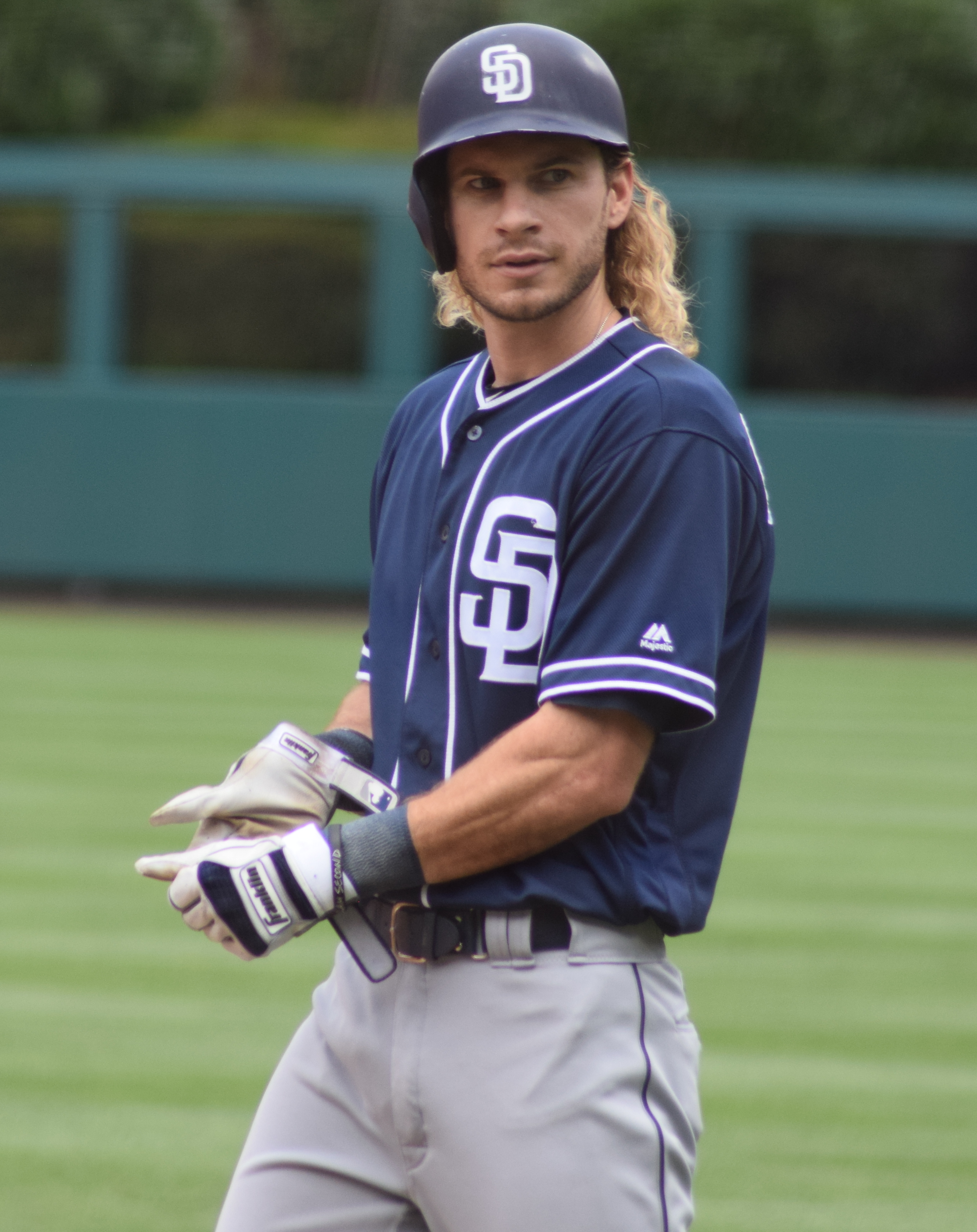
Jankowski with the Padres in 2019

During a spring training game in 2019, Jankowski suffered a fractured wrist while diving after a fly ball, and he was expected to miss three months of the season while recovering. He suffered a series of setbacks after surgery, and did not return to the field until August 6. After only five days, the Padres sent him back down to El Paso, where he remained until rosters expanded on September 1. Jankowski appeared in only 25 games for the Padres in 2019, batting .182 and stealing two bases.

=== Cincinnati Reds (2020) ===
On October 31, 2019, immediately after the conclusion of the MLB season, Jankowski was traded to the Cincinnati Reds in exchange for international bonus slot cash. As the 2020 MLB season was delayed due to the COVID-19 pandemic, Jankowski was one of 22 players sent to Prasco Park in July for additional spring training. He told reporters there that he anticipated a new extra innings rule, in which teams began with a runner on second base, would help his chances of being named to the major league roster. Jankowski was named to the Reds' Opening Day roster on July 24, 2020, with plans to be used as a pinch runner in later innings. After going 1-for-15 in 16 games, the Reds optioned Jankowski to their alternate training site on August 26. He returned to the roster on September 30 for the postseason, and stole one base as a pinch runner in the first game of the 2020 National League Wild Card Series against the Atlanta Braves. On October 14, Jankowski, alongside infielder Matt Davidson and relievers Jesse Biddle and Matt Bowman, were removed from the 40-man roster. In 16 games for the Reds, Jankowski batted .067, with one hit and two stolen bases. He elected free agency on November 2.

=== Philadelphia Phillies (2021) ===
On February 15, 2021, Jankowski signed a minor league contract with the Philadelphia Phillies, a deal which included an invitation to spring training. On May 30, after outfielder Roman Quinn suffered a ruptured Achilles tendon and was expected to miss the remainder of the 2021 MLB season, Jankowski was promoted from the Triple-A Lehigh Valley IronPigs to take his place in the roster. He debuted with the team on June 4, replacing Rhys Hoskins in the ninth inning of a game against the Washington Nationals. Jankowski was caught stealing by Nationals catcher Alex Avila, a play which led to booing from Phillies fans at Citizens Bank Park. He used the incident to focus on improving his offensive performance, and improved to 9 hits in his first 26 at bats. Jankowski hit .252/.364/.351 with one home run and 10 RBI in 76 games for Philadelphia in 2021. On November 5, 2021, Jankowski was outrighted off of the 40-man roster and elected free agency.

=== New York Mets (2022) ===
On March 17, 2022, the New York Mets signed Jankowski to a minor league contract with an invitation to spring training. On April 6, the Mets selected Jankowski's contract, adding him to their Opening Day roster. In his first start on April 9, he stole two bases against the Nationals. In the Mets' home opener against the Arizona Diamondbacks on April 15, he had a three-hit game.

Jankowski served as the Mets' fourth outfielder. He broke his hand on May 25 after making a diving catch to rob San Francisco Giants catcher Joey Bart of a hit, and was placed on the injured list expected to miss 6–8 weeks. On July 11, Jankowski was activated from the injured list. On July 29, Jankowski was designated for assignment by the Mets.

=== Seattle Mariners (2022) ===
On August 1, 2022, Jankowski was claimed off waivers by the Seattle Mariners. He was designated for assignment on August 5. On August 9, Jankowski declined an outright assignment to the Triple-A Tacoma Rainiers and elected free agency.

=== New York Mets (2022) ===
On August 13, 2022, the New York Mets re-signed Jankowski to a minor league contract. In 36 games for the Triple-A Syracuse Mets, he batted .237/.387/.298 with one home run, 6 RBI, and 15 stolen bases. Jankowski elected free agency following the season on November 10.

=== Texas Rangers (2023–2024) ===
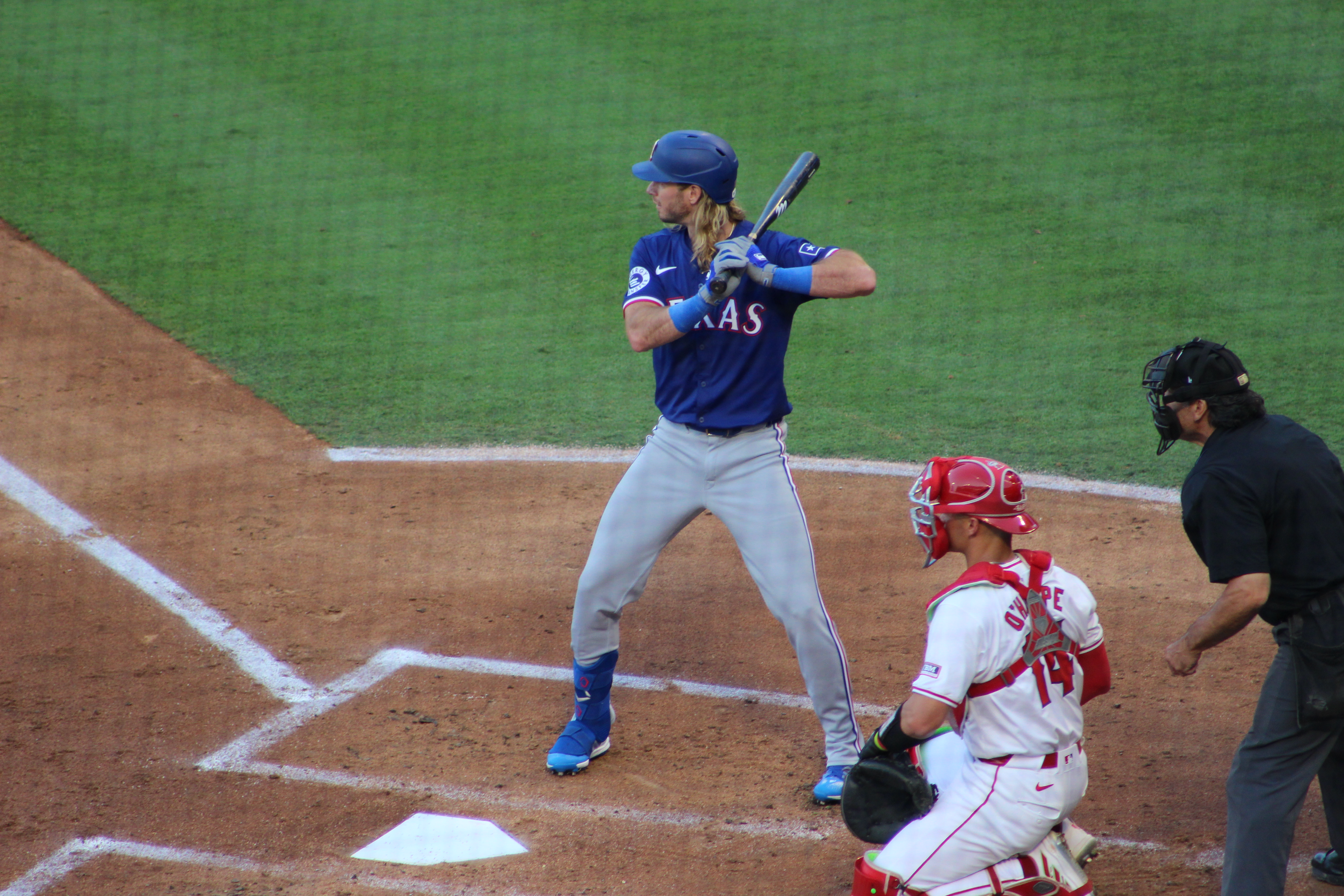
Jankowski with the Rangers in 2024

On January 27, 2023, Jankowski signed a minor league contract with the Texas Rangers organization. On March 29, it was announced that Jankowski had made the Opening Day roster, and had his contract selected to the 40-man roster.

On May 9, Jankowski was placed on the injured list with a hamstring strain. He was activated on May 27. Jankowski hit his only home run of the season and recorded 5 RBI against the Houston Astros on July 3. Jankowski became the Rangers' strong-side platoon left fielder, batting .331 with an .850 OPS through July 19. He recorded his first career RBI sacrifice fly on July 21 after 1,390 plate appearances. An August slump saw Jankowski lose his starting role in September. He ended the season slashing .263/.357/.332 in 287 plate appearances, played in 107 games with 63 starts and led the Rangers with 19 stolen bases.

In his first career playoff at-bat, Jankowski was robbed of a home run by Astros outfielder Kyle Tucker in Game 6 of the 2023 American League Championship Series. He recorded his first postseason hit, a single, the following day in Game 7. Jankowski replaced starting right fielder Adolis García in Game 3 of the World Series after García suffered an oblique injury in the 8th inning. García was ruled out for the series and Jankowski made his first career World Series start in Game 4 on October 31. Jankowski recorded two hits, two RBI and two runs scored while making a sliding catch that narrowly avoided colliding with Marcus Semien to end the 7th inning. The Rangers won 11–7 and The Athletic named him an "unlikely fall hero" for his efforts filling in for the Rangers' hottest playoff hitter. Jankowski started Game 5 in right field again as the Rangers beat the Arizona Diamondbacks to win the franchise's first World Series championship.

On January 26, 2024, Jankowski re-signed with the Rangers on a one-year, $1.7 million contract. On March 28 against the Chicago Cubs, he hit an Opening Day pinch-hit game-tying home run in the bottom of the 9th, the 11th home run of his career. On August 28, Jankowski robbed Andrew Vaughn and the Chicago White Sox of a walk-off home run in a play that topped the SportsCenter top 10. Jankowski stole his 100th career base on August 31. On September 26, Jankowski became the last player to bat at the Oakland Coliseum in a major league game. In 104 appearances for the Rangers, he slashed .200/.266/.242 with one home run, 12 RBI, and 11 stolen bases.

=== Chicago White Sox (2025) ===
On February 21, 2025, Jankowski signed a minor league contract with the Chicago Cubs. He was released by the Cubs organization on March 11. The next day, Jankowski signed a minor league contract with the Chicago White Sox. On March 27, the White Sox selected Jankowski's contract after he made the team's Opening Day roster. In 7 appearances for Chicago, he went 3-for-14 (.214) with one walk. Jankowski was designated for assignment by the White Sox after Mike Tauchman was activated from the injured list on April 6. He elected free agency after clearing waivers on April 8. The next day, Jankowski re-signed with the White Sox on a minor league contract. In five games for Triple-A Charlotte, he went 6-for-23 (.261) with one home run and two RBI.

=== Tampa Bay Rays (2025) ===
On April 25, 2025, Jankowski was traded to the Tampa Bay Rays. The following day, the Rays selected Jankowski's contract, adding him to their active roster. In 14 appearances for Tampa Bay, he batted .258/.294/.323 with two RBI and two stolen bases. On June 4, Jankowski elected free agency after being removed from the team's 40-man roster.

=== New York Mets (2025) ===
On June 10, 2025, Jankowski signed a minor league contract with the New York Mets. In eight games for the Triple-A Syracuse Mets, he went 7-for-35 (.200) with one home run, five RBI, and two stolen bases. On June 23, the Mets selected Jankowski's contract, adding him to their active roster. He was designated for assignment on July 10. Jankowski elected free agency after clearing waivers on July 13.

== Coaching career ==
On November 12, 2025, it was announced that the Texas Rangers had hired Jankowski to serve as the team's first base coach.

== International career ==
In 2015, Jankowski served as the leadoff hitter for Team USA at the Pan American Games. His banner moment in the series came in the semifinal rounds against Cuba. In the ninth inning, Jankowski singled to center field, then quickly stole second base before Andy Parrino drove the run in, pushing Team USA to the finals. The team ultimately took silver in the tournament.

== Player profile ==
Jankowski has developed a batting style that favors putting balls in play rather than aiming for home runs. Critical to this process has been a better sense of pitch discipline, swinging only when he believes that he can be productive. This was seen most effectively during the 2018 season, in which he served as the Padres' leadoff hitter. After three seasons of swinging at 22 percent or more of pitches outside the strike zone, he dropped that number to 13.8 percent. He has also developed a reputation as an elite base stealer, another skill that he attributes to discipline. Jankowski has watched videos of the pitchers that he faces so that he can understand how they react with a runner on base, and he uses that information to decide whether or not to attempt to steal. He is adamant that speed alone is insufficient to become a notable base stealer, and that "There are more runners in baseball than base stealers."

For most of his career, Jankowski has seen heavy competition for limited outfield positions. In addition to his offensive production, he has expanded his versatility by learning how to play in all three outfield positions. In 2016, while serving primarily as a relief in right field for starter Matt Kemp, Padres manager Andy Green said that "Travis has more range than 99.9 percent of all outfielders in Major League Baseball". While playing in Double-A, Jankowski's strong defensive performance in center field drew comparisons to players such as Devon White and Willie Wilson, while his nickname, "Secretary of Defense", was originally held by former Phillies center fielder Garry Maddox.

== Personal life ==
Jankowski married his wife, Lindsey, on October 27, 2017. His Padres teammates Cory Spangenberg and Colin Rea served as groomsmen at the wedding. The couple have two sons and one daughter together. They reside in Lancaster during the offseason.

Jankowski has gone by the nickname "Freddy" since his high school baseball career. The name originated from a childhood fascination with Fred Rogers, the host of Mister Rogers' Neighborhood. While playing with the Reds in 2020, Jankowski was also frequently mistaken for retired pitcher Bronson Arroyo due to their similar frames and long blond hair.
