= Gary P. Gilroy =

Gary Patrick Gilroy
- Born: 1958 (age 67–68)
- Occupations: Band director; composer

Gary Patrick Gilroy (born 1958) is a musician, composer, and educator. In 2025, he retired from his position as Professor of Music and Director of Bands at California State University, Fresno.

Gilroy assumed the position of Associate Director of Bands and Director of the Bulldog Marching Band at Fresno State in 1993. Prior to this appointment, he was the band director of Fred C. Beyer High School in Modesto, California where his band was awarded several national honors, including the International Sudler Shield Award from the John Philip Sousa Foundation.

Gilroy has served as an adjudicator for Drum Corps International, Music in the Parks, and Bands of America and has furthermore been involved as an instructor or arranger for several drum and bugle corps including the Santa Clara Vanguard and the Concord Blue Devils.
