= Bourne Braves =

Collegiate summer baseball team in Massachusetts

Information
- League: Cape Cod Baseball League (West Division)
- Location: Bourne, Massachusetts
- Ballpark: Doran Park
- League championships: 1936, 1951, 1954, 1956, 1959, 1965, 2009, 2022, 2023, 2025
- Former name: Bourne Canalmen; Sagamore Clouters
- Colors: Red, Navy Blue, and Gold
- Ownership: Bourne Athletic Association
- President: Nicole Norkevicius
- General manager: Matt Karas
- Manager: Scott Landers
- Website: www.capecodleague.com/bourne/

The Bourne Braves are a collegiate summer baseball team based in Bourne, Massachusetts. The team is a member of the Cape Cod Baseball League (CCBL) and plays in the league's West Division. The Braves play their home games at Doran Park on the campus of Upper Cape Cod Regional Technical School in Bourne. The Braves are owned and operated by the non-profit Bourne Athletic Association.

Bourne won its fifth overall CCBL championship of the modern era by defeating the Yarmouth–Dennis Red Sox to win the 2025 finals series. Teams from Bourne/Sagamore have claimed ten championship titles since the league's beginnings, and over 100 players have gone on to play in Major League Baseball.

== History ==
=== Pre-modern era ===
==== Early years ====
Bourne's baseball history is one of the longest of all teams on the Cape, dating as far back as the 1860s when the town was still part of Sandwich. In 1867, Sandwich had four organized baseball teams: the Nichols, Independent, Shawme, and American clubs. The "Independent Club" defeated the "Mattakeesetts" of Yarmouth that year, winning 41–35 in eight innings. The same year, the "Nichols Club" played a series of three games against the "Cummaquid Club" of Barnstable. The first game, played "a short distance from the Sandwich Glass Company's works," was won by the Cummaquids, but the Nichols Club took the second game played in Barnstable. The third game was contested at a "neutral" site in West Barnstable, with the Cummaquid Club taking the rubber match. Of these early contests, it was reported that, "a large party from this and adjoining villages were present to witness the game, and as it was new to very many of the number, it was of unusual interest."

In 1909, a team from Bourne sponsored by the Keith Car & Manufacturing Company of Sagamore played a pair of games against the Falmouth town team. In 1910, the Sagamore club was described as "one of the finest local teams on the Cape." Although the 1910 team lost twice to the powerful Hyannis town team early in the summer, the Keith squad had its revenge at the close of the season in what was billed as the baseball "championship of the Cape" at the annual Barnstable County Fair. In the four-team tournament, Falmouth defeated Hyannis and Sagamore shut out Wellfleet to set up a final game between Sagamore and Falmouth. On a rain-soaked day that produced "mud and slippery ball and bats," Sagamore prevailed in a shortened seven-inning contest, by a score reported variously as 9–3 or 10–3. The Keith team had another successful year in 1911, and again made a strong showing at the season-ending fair tournament. The Keith Car team continued to compete through at least the 1913 season, when the club was described as the "strongest team on the Cape."

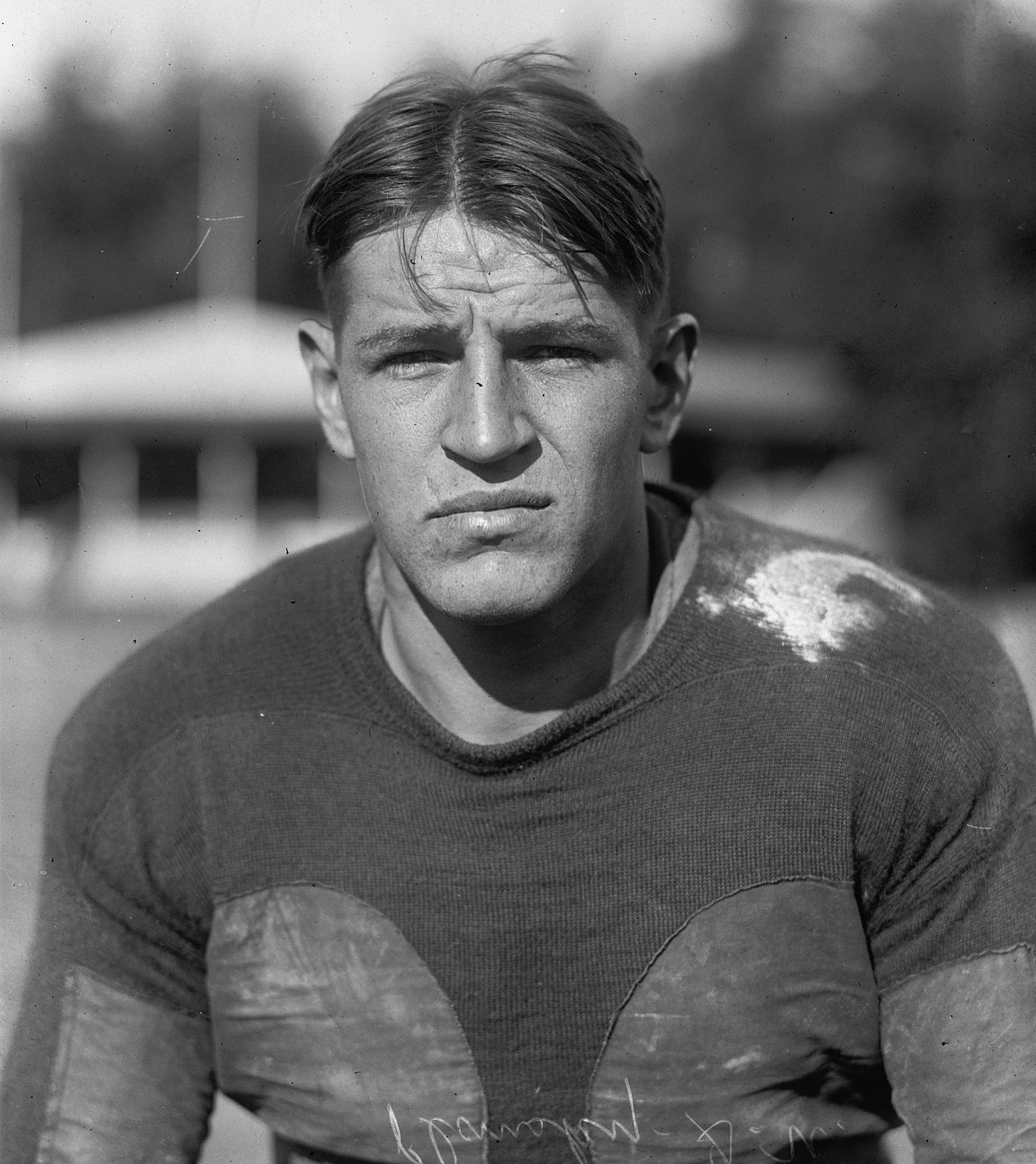
Georgetown and NFL fullback and CCBL Hall of Famer Tony Plansky was a perennial league all-star for Bourne in the 1930s and a member the 1936 title club

==== The early Cape League era (1923–1939) ====
Bourne first joined the Cape League in 1933. The league had begun in 1923 with four teams, but over the years various towns moved in and out of the league. In 1933, Provincetown had joined the league for the first time, but withdrew mid-season. Bourne stepped in and played out the remainder of Provincetown's schedule, but won only one game in its inaugural partial season. Bourne remained in the league until the league itself folded after the 1939 season, and played its home games at the Bourne High School diamond.

In 1934 and 1935, Bourne featured hard-hitting third baseman Bob "Red" Daughters, who went on to play for the Boston Red Sox, and Freddie Moncewicz, a longtime Hyannis/Barnstable infielder who had played for Boston in 1928. Bourne's mainstay during this period was Massachusetts native Tony Plansky, who was a league all-star for Bourne each year from 1933 to 1939. Plansky, a star fullback from Georgetown University, had played professionally in the National Football League for the New York Giants and Boston Braves. Prior to the NFL, Plansky had played for Hyannis in the Cape League in 1928, and when his football career was over, Plansky returned to the Cape to play for Bourne. In 1999, Plansky was ranked by Sports Illustrated as the #25 all-time greatest sports figure from Massachusetts. He was inducted into the CCBL Hall of Fame in 2001.

Bourne had its most successful campaign of the era in 1936, winning the Cape League title led by player-manager Larry Donovan, the team's first baseman. In addition to perennial all-star Plansky, Donovan's club featured local star third baseman Ugo Tassinari, as well as several "winning pitchers" including Frank "Quack" Escott, Al Sayce, and Ray Chamberlain. Normally during this period, the Cape League season had no playoffs; a champion was determined by the best regular season record. But as it had done in 1933 and 1935, the league split the 1936 season in two half-seasons, with the winners of the two halves meeting in a postseason series for the overall title. In 1936, no postseason was needed, as Bourne took both the first and second half titles and was declared league champion.

==== The Upper and Lower Cape League era (1946–1962) ====
The Cape League was revived after World War II, and the new league began play in 1946 with 11 teams playing in Upper Cape and Lower Cape divisions. The town of Bourne was represented in the Upper Cape Division by Bourne and Sagamore teams. Bourne's team became known as the Bourne Canalmen, and Sagamore's as the Sagamore Canal Clouters, or Sagamore Clouters.

===== Bourne Canalmen =====
The Canalmen played in the league until 1950, then after a decade-long hiatus, returned to the league in 1961. The Bourne team of the 1940s featured CCBL Hall of Famer Jack Sanford, a hard-throwing lefty who went on to play with Sagamore until 1954, winning a career total of 60 games in the league, including a no-hitter in 1953.

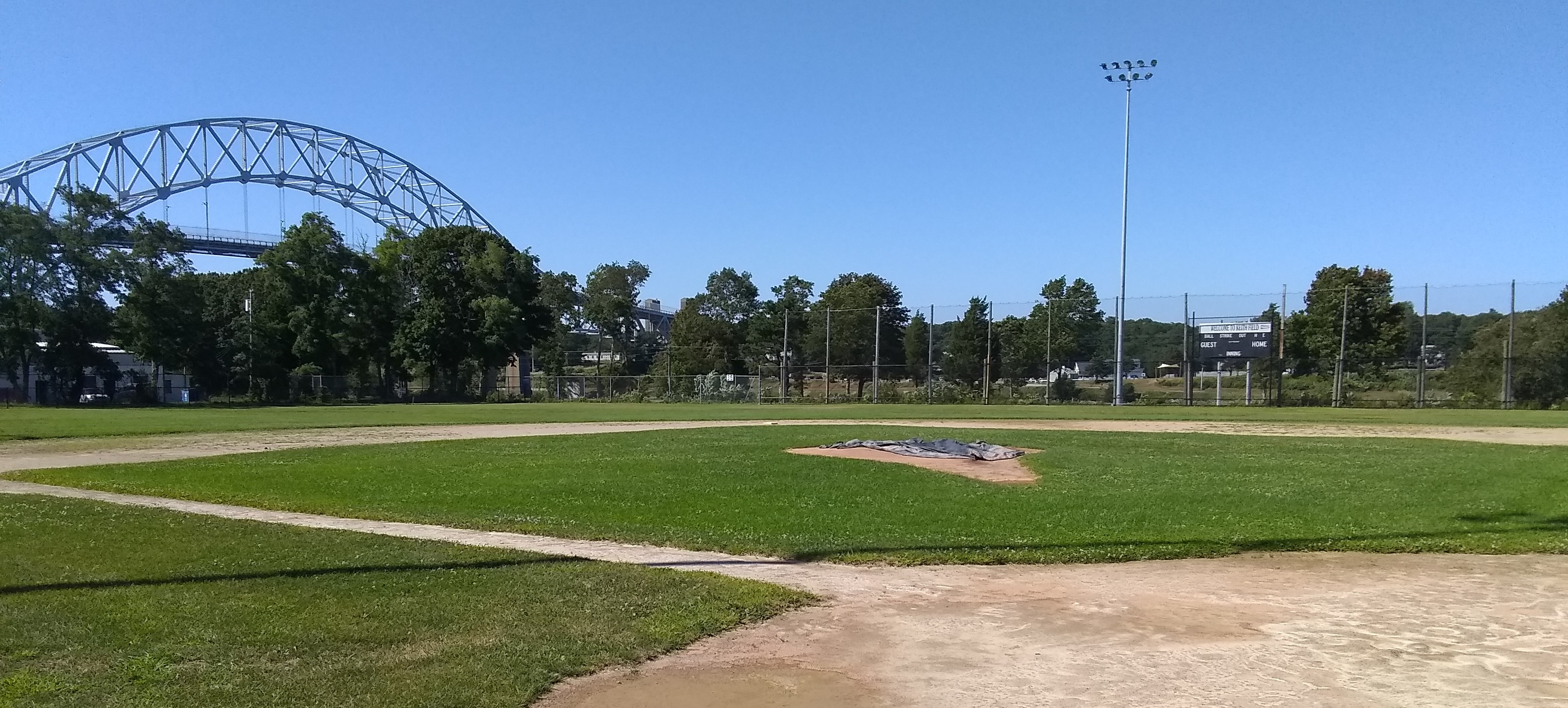
Keith Field, former home of the Sagamore Clouters

===== Sagamore Clouters =====
The Clouters played at Keith Field, just steps from the Cape Cod Canal in the shadow of the Sagamore Bridge. Keith Field had been dedicated in 1936 and named in memory of Bourne native Eben Keith, a Massachusetts state senator and head of Keith Car & Manufacturing Company, once the Cape's largest industrial plant. The field was constructed privately by the Marconi Social and Athletic Club on land previously occupied by the Keith plant.

The Clouters were initially led by CCBL Hall of Fame manager Pat Sorenti, who later served as president and commissioner of the Cape League. CCBL Hall of Famer George Karras was Sagamore's player-manager from 1948 to 1954. Karras' teams starred CCBL Hall of Famer Tello Tontini, the team's popular infielder, who was a seven-time all-star for Sagamore from 1946 to 1952. Karras was followed by fellow CCBL Hall of Famer Manny Pena, who had played in the league for Falmouth and Sagamore from 1946 to 1955, and skippered the Clouters from 1956 to 1961.

Sagamore was a league powerhouse throughout the decade of the 1950s. To fans, it seemed that Sagamore would reach the league championship series every season, usually to face the Lower Cape's dominant team, Orleans. The Clouters claimed league titles in 1951, 1954, 1956 and 1959. At a time when most Cape League teams generally abided by the unwritten rule of using predominantly local players, Sagamore led the way in recruiting collegiate talent, and so set the stage for the league's modern era.

The Clouters first reached the title series in 1950, when they were downed by Orleans, but Sagamore had its revenge in the 1951 title rematch. In the most drawn-out championship series in league history, the best-of-five 1951 CCBL championship series was scheduled with just one game each week, and so began in late August and ended on the final day of September. The Clouters were on the verge of being swept after dropping Game 1 at home, 4–2, and Game 2 at Eldredge Park, 2–1. A classic Game 3 saw Sagamore turn the series around on a last-minute rally. Orleans had scored early in Game 3 at Keith Field, and Sagamore manager Karras brought in CCBL Hall of Fame hurler Jack Sanford, just back in his first game after a tour in Korea with the US Army, for long relief in the second inning. Sanford kept the game close, but the Clouters found themselves trailing, 5–4, in the bottom of the ninth. Needing only one final out to secure the series, Orleans committed a throwing error that scored Walt Stahura from third base. With the bases loaded and the score now tied, pinch-hitter Bill McCabe drew a walk that sent CCBL Hall of Famer Tello Tontini across the plate with the winning run. The Clouters started Sanford on the mound in Game 4 on the road, and came away with a 10–8 win highlighted by a six-run fourth inning that was manufactured on just two hits. Sanford got the call again in the Game 5 finale at neutral Lowell Park, and twirled a six-hit complete game 8–4 victory to give the championship to Sagamore. Sanford's impressive final line for the series included three wins on the mound, and a 5-for-12 performance at the plate.

Orleans topped Sagamore in the 1952 and 1953 championship series, but Sagamore rebounded again as the two clubs met in the title tilt for the fifth consecutive season in 1954. Games 1 and 2 of the 1954 championship were played as a doubleheader. In a matchup of CCBL Hall of Fame hurlers, Orleans took Game 1, 4–3, with Roy Bruninghaus outdueling the Clouters' Jack Sanford. Sagamore answered in Game 2 with a 5–3 victory behind moundsman Dick Smith. The Clouters took Game 3, but Orleans knotted the series with a 10–6 Game 4 victory, setting up a decisive Game 5 to be played on the neutral Veterans Field in Chatham. In the finale, the Clouters held down Orleans early, leading 5–0 after seven behind a masterful performance by Sanford. Orleans rallied to score three in the eighth, and with two down in the ninth, pushed across another and put the tying run on second. With the series on the line, Sanford put Orleans batter Johnny Linnell in the hole with two quick strikes. Linnell managed to foul off the next five offerings before Sanford finally whiffed him on a high ball to claim the crown for the Clouters.

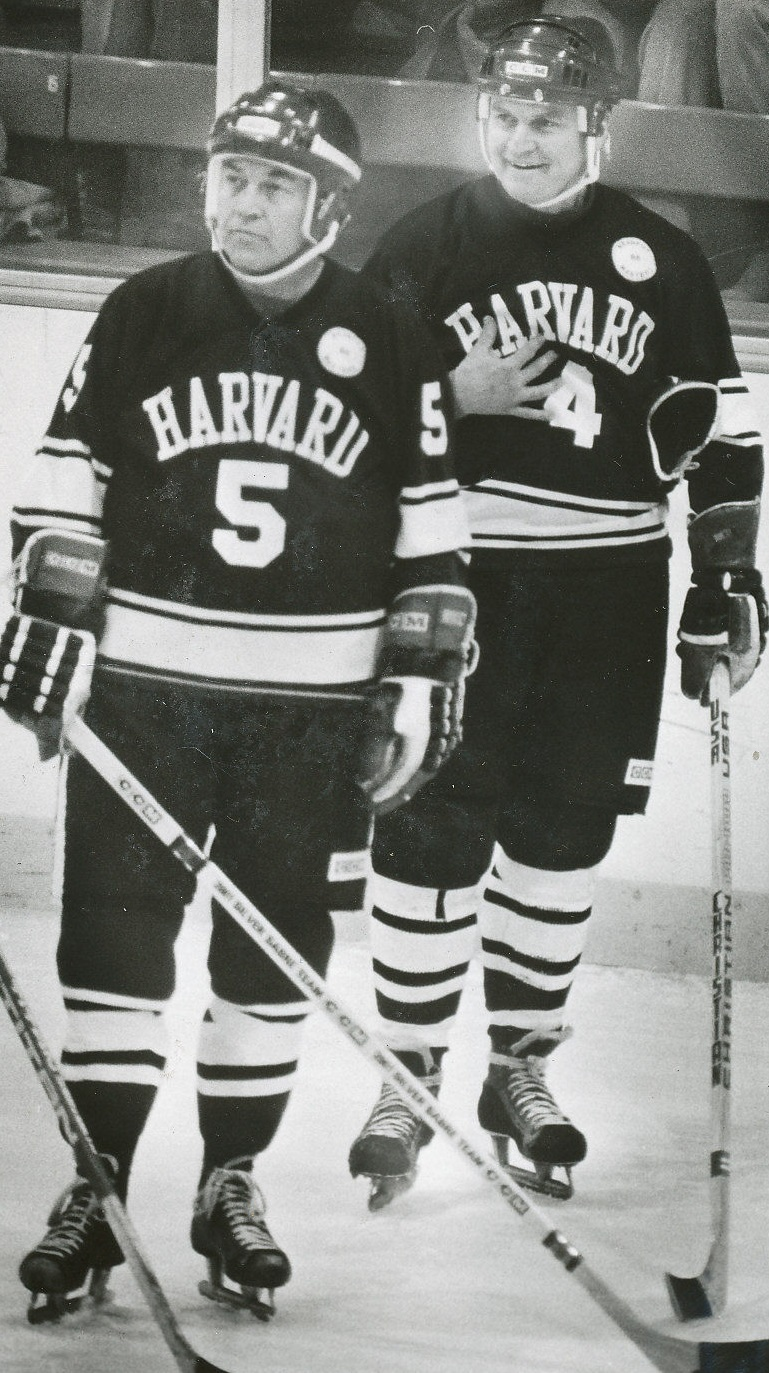
In the late 1950s, brothers Billy and Bobby Cleary played for the Sagamore Clouters. The pair went on to lead the US to Olympic gold in ice hockey in 1960.

From 1955 to 1958, the Clouters featured Billy Cleary, the 1958 Upper Cape MVP, and his brother Bobby Cleary. The Clearys were Harvard ice hockey standouts who went on to lead the US ice hockey team to a gold medal at the 1960 Winter Olympics. The Clouters were back in championship form in 1956 as Pena's men faced Cotuit for the 1956 Upper Cape title, and swept the Kettleers in two games. Sagamore jumped out early in Game 1 at Lowell Park with a six-run second frame, and hurler Johnny Karras made it stand up, tossing a complete game in the 7–5 win. The Clouters pasted Cotuit at Keith Field in Game 2, striking in the second once again with an eight-run frame, and riding the strong arm of Dick Smith to the 13–2 victory. The win sent Sagamore to the Cape League title series against the Lower Cape champion Dennis Clippers. Smith twirled a two-hitter in Game 1 of the title tilt, and the Clouters downed the Clippers at Dennis, 7–1. Game 2 was a tight pitcher's duel early, but Sagamore scratched out a 5–3 win to secure its third Cape League championship in six years.

Sagamore's 1958 and 1959 teams featured Bill Powers, who earned the Upper Cape Division's Most Valuable Pitcher Award in both seasons. Pena's Clouters reached the championship series again in 1958, but were downed by Yarmouth, then bounced back in 1959 to claim another CCBL championship. Sagamore finished atop the Upper Cape league in both halves of the 1959 regular season, earning a spot in the title series against their familiar foe, Lower Cape champ Orleans. The Clouters jumped ahead in the best-of-three 1959 championship series as Powers went the distance on the mound in the 14–4 Game 1 rout at Keith Field. Sagamore completed the sweep in Game 2 at Eldredge Park, scratching out a 5–3 win to give the Clouters the title. The 1959 series was the Clouters' final championship matchup with longtime foe Orleans, and Sagamore's win evened the score at three titles apiece over the teams' six title tilts in the decade.

In a repeat of its 1958 title loss, Sagamore was again downed in the 1960 championship series by Lower Cape champion Yarmouth. The 1962 Clouters featured CCBL Hall of Famer Wayne Granger, who hit .329 with six homers.

=== Modern era (1963–present) ===
==== The 1960s and 1970s ====
In 1963, the CCBL was reorganized and became officially sanctioned by the NCAA. The league would no longer be characterized by "town teams" who fielded mainly Cape Cod residents, but would now be a formal collegiate league. Teams began to recruit college players and coaches from an increasingly wide geographic radius.

The league was originally composed of ten teams, which were divided into Upper Cape and Lower Cape divisions. The Clouters and Canalmen joined Wareham, Falmouth, and Cotuit in the Upper Cape Division.

Bourne reached the playoffs in 1963, but was bumped out in the first round by Wareham. In 1964, CCBL Hall of Famer Lou Lamoriello became Bourne's 21-year-old player-manager. Lamoriello had played in the Cape League since 1961 with Harwich and Orleans. His 1964 Bourne club starred CCBL Hall of Famer and league batting champion Harry Nelson, who hit .390 for the season.

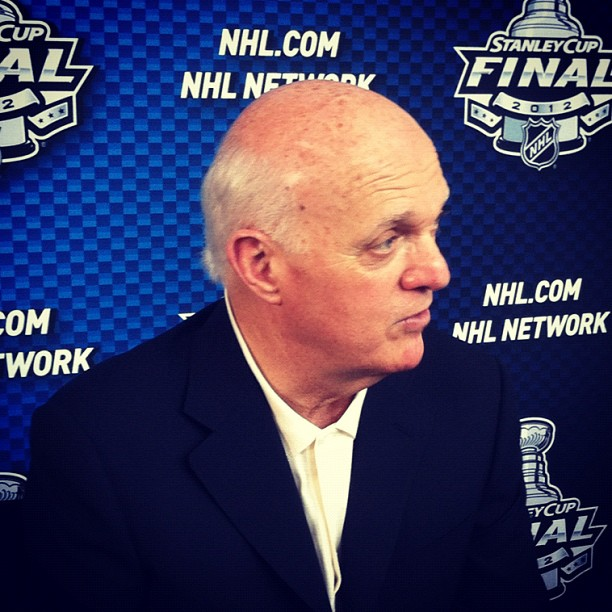
CCBL Hall of Famer Lou Lamoriello skippered Sagamore to the CCBL title in 1965.

Sagamore's 1963 team featured future major league all-star Billy Grabarkewitz, but the team finished in last place with only six wins on the season.

The two teams from Bourne merged for the 1965 season as the Sagamore Canalmen. The 1965 team was skippered by Lou Lamoriello, now no longer in a player-manager role. Powered by an array of talented ballplayers, including league MVP Ron Bugbee, and CCBL Hall of Famers Dan DeMichele, shortstop Bob Schaefer, and pitcher Noel Kinski, who won 10 games for the team. The 1965 club went 25–9 in the regular season and met Lower Cape champ Chatham in the best-of-five CCBL title series. Kinski got the 4–3 win for Sagamore in Game 1 at Veterans Field, but the Canalmen lost a 16–14 slugfest as the teams combined for nine home runs at cozy Keith Field in Game 2. Kinski was on the mound again on the road for Game 3, and tossed a complete game three-hit gem in the 2–1 Sagamore victory. Chatham again knotted the series with a Game 4 win, setting up the Game 5 finale back in Chatham. Making his first start of the season on the mound, the Canalmen's Bob Ritchie overcame Chatham's four-run first inning to scatter nine hits in a complete game 5–4 win that gave Sagamore the league championship.

In 1967, the club reclaimed its former moniker Bourne Canalmen, and the late 1960s saw two more CCBL Hall of Fame players on the team. Former Bourne High School baseball star Jim Prete played several seasons in the CCBL with Bourne and Wareham. Notre Dame slugger Dick Licini was league MVP in 1968, leading the league with a .382 batting average.

Bourne withdrew from the league for the 1970 season, but was back the following season. 1971 and 1972 saw the return of 1965 Sagamore shortstop Bob Schaefer, now the pilot of the Bourne team. Schaefer's 1972 team featured CCBL Hall of Fame pitcher John Caneira, who racked up 119 strikeouts as the league's Outstanding Pitcher. The team folded after the 1972 season, beginning a 16-year period when Bourne did not field a team in the league.

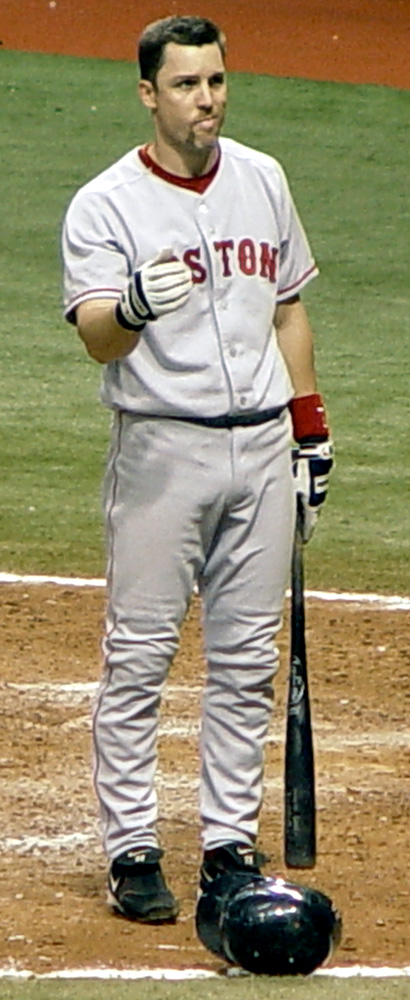
Bill Mueller, 1992 Bourne Brave and starting third basemen for the 2004 World Series champion Boston Red Sox

==== The 1980s: the Braves are born ====
In 1988, the Cape League expanded from eight teams to ten, adding the Brewster Whitecaps and Bourne Braves, and forming two new five-team divisions. The drive to secure a team for Bourne was led by CCBL Hall of Famers Jack Aylmer, president of Bourne's Massachusetts Maritime Academy and a former state senator, and Maritime head baseball coach Bob Corradi. Aylmer had spearheaded the Cape League's addition of an expansion franchise in Hyannis in 1976, and their positions at the Maritime Academy afforded Aylmer and Corradi a similar opportunity in 1988. The Bourne Braves called the Academy's Hendy Field home from 1988 to 1995, when they moved to Coady School Field next to Bourne High School.

In their inaugural 1988 season, the Braves were skippered by Maritime Academy assistant coach Jim Watkins. Worcester, Massachusetts native and Dartmouth College product Mark Johnson played for the Braves in 1988 and 1989, and went on to play several seasons in the big leagues. In 1989, just the Braves' second year in the league, Watkins' squad finished the regular season in first place atop the West Division, but was bumped from the playoffs in the West finals by Hyannis. The 1989 Braves starred infielder Bob Rivell, the league's 10th Player Award winner, who led the league with a .358 batting average, and also featured Cape Cod native Jeff Handler of Harwich, the team's starting third baseman from Eastern Connecticut State University.

==== The 1990s ====
Bourne struggled throughout the 1990s, and fan support was low at times. The team made the playoffs only twice, being ousted by Wareham in the West Division finals in both 1997 and 1998. Notable players of the decade included local product Steve Corradi of Sandwich and UMass-Amherst, who was a league all-star for the Braves in 1990, and returned to the Braves in 1991 and 1992. The 1991 Braves featured two future CCBL Hall of Famers: Framingham, Massachusetts native Lou Merloni, and tall righty Bill Wissler, who returned from the 1990 team and was named the league's Outstanding Pitcher in both seasons. Wissler had posted an 8–2 record with a 1.56 ERA in 1990. In 1991, he led the league in innings pitched with 92, and posted a 1.96 ERA with seven complete games and three shutouts. The 1991 squad also featured slugger Bobby Higginson, who went on to an 11-year career with the Detroit Tigers. Bill Mueller was a Cape League all-star with the 1992 Braves, then went on to win an American League batting title, and was starting third baseman for the World Series champion 2004 Boston Red Sox. 1992 Braves hurler Ron Villone left the team mid-season to play for Team USA at the 1992 Summer Olympics in Barcelona, and 1994 Brave Mark Kotsay won a bronze medal with Team USA at the 1996 Atlanta Olympics before going on to a 17-year major league career. CCBL Hall of Fame skipper Bob Stead managed the club in 1995 and 1996, and future major league all-stars Brandon Inge and hurler Mark Mulder were CCBL all-stars for the Braves in 1997.

==== The 2000s and the Braves' first championship ====
Bourne's 2001 team featured CCBL Hall of Fame reliever Ryan Speier, winner of the league's Outstanding Relief Pitcher Award. Speier set a league record with 16 saves, and allowed only 10 hits, one walk, and one earned run in his 20 innings of relief. The team made the playoffs, but was once again ousted by Wareham.

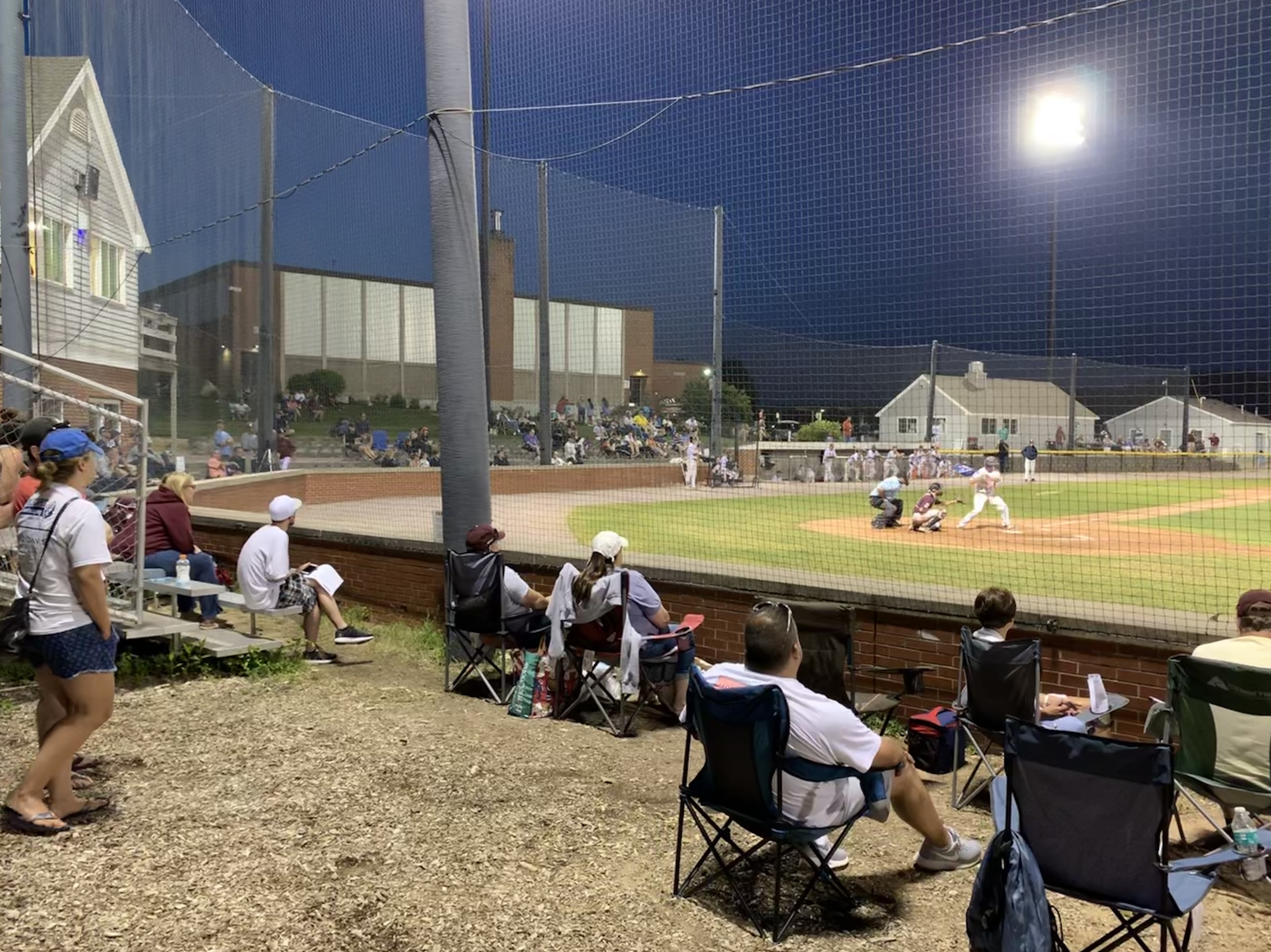
A night game at Doran Park, home of the Bourne Braves since 2006

2003 saw the arrival of CCBL Hall of Fame manager Harvey Shapiro. In his first year with the team, Shapiro led the Braves to their first appearance in the league's championship series, where they were defeated by Orleans. The Braves were led by the microscopic earned run averages of Kyle Schmidt (0.55) and CCBL Hall of Famer Eric Beattie (0.39). Beattie went 4–0 and struck out 51 while walking only six on the season, and was named the league's Outstanding Pitcher. The team again reached the championship series in 2005, but was again shut down by Orleans.

In 2006, the Braves moved from Coady Field to a new field constructed behind Upper Cape Cod Regional Technical School. The following season, the field was dedicated as "Doran Park" in honor of George Doran, Sr. The 2006 team was powered by future Boston Red Sox slugger Mitch Moreland, who won the league's annual All-Star Game Home Run Derby.

In 2009, the Braves finished in first place in the West Division, and featured the league's MVP in CCBL Hall of Famer Kyle Roller, who hit .342 with 33 RBIs and a league-best 10 home runs during the regular season, and Pierre LePage, the spark plug of Shapiro's club, who was the league's 10th Player Award winner. In a year when playoff seedings crossed divisional lines, Bourne faced old nemesis Orleans for the right to advance to the championship series.

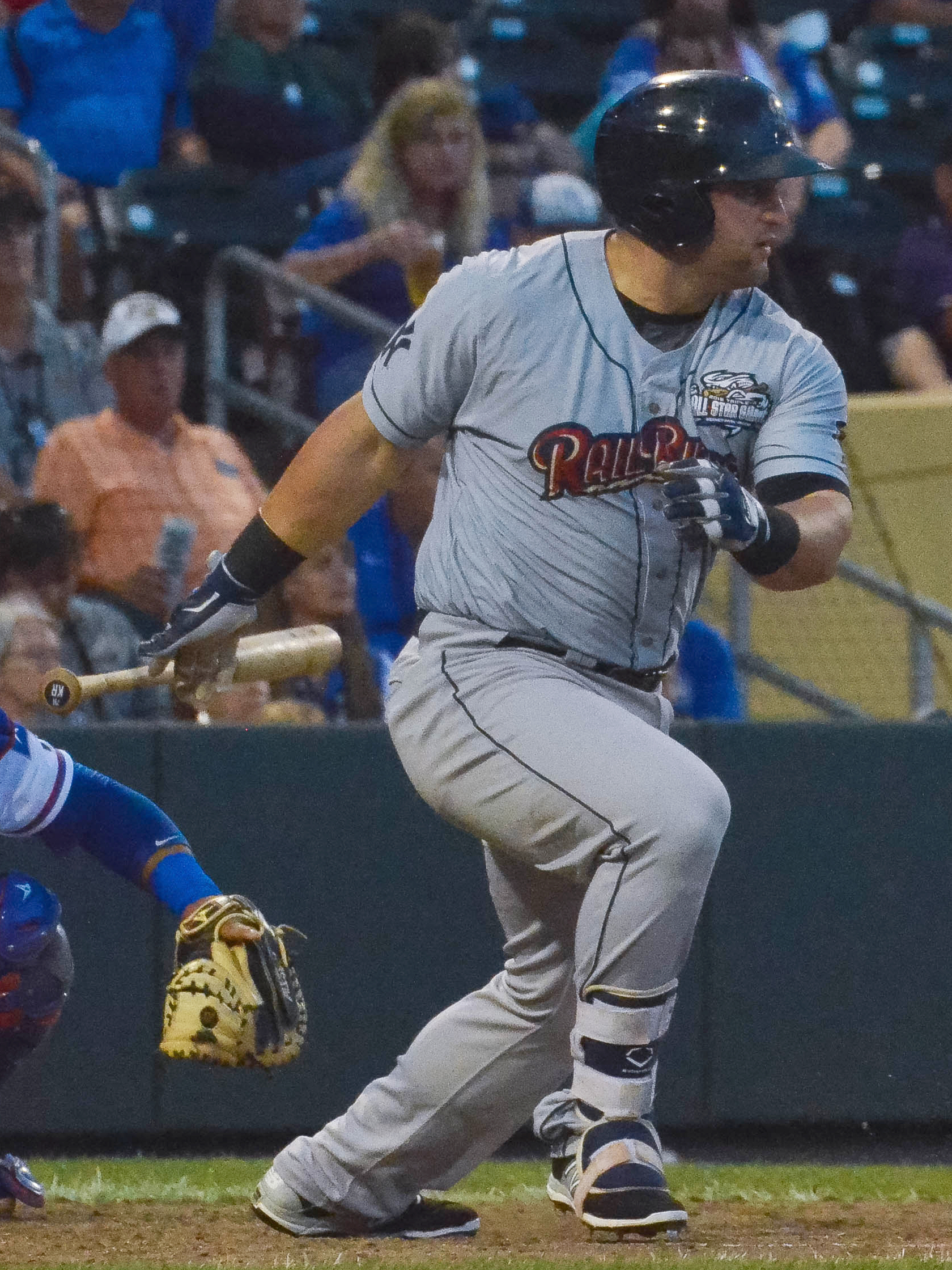
CCBL Hall of Famer Kyle Roller was playoff MVP of the Braves 2009 championship team.

Game 1 of the semi-final series did not look good for Bourne, as Orleans hurler Jorge Reyes dominated the Braves through eight innings at Doran Park, and took a 2–0 lead into the final frame. But with one out in the ninth, Bourne's Scott Woodward singled, and LePage drew a four-pitch walk that marked the end of Reyes' night. Roller then lined a shot off the shortstop's glove into left field that allowed Woodward to score on a close play at home. LePage scored the game-tying run on a wild pitch, and Stefan Romero belted a long sacrifice fly that brought in Roller from third with the walk-off score. Game 2 at Eldredge Park was not as dramatic. Braves starter Seth Maness set down 10 straight Firebirds to open the game, and Bourne got solo shots from LePage and Roller, going on to shut out Orleans, 8–0, and sweeping its way into the CCBL title series against Cotuit.

The championship series opened at Doran Park, with the Braves starting Alex Wimmers on the mound for Game 1. The Braves proceeded to jump all over the Kettleers, scoring seven in the first, and another six in the second, on a total of eight hits and eight walks in the first two frames. Cotuit managed only one run through five innings, but had begun to make noise in the sixth when the game was interrupted multiple times and finally called due to heavy fog, a 15–5 Braves victory. In Game 2 at Lowell Park, LePage again was the spark, belting a two-run single in the third, then stealing second and drawing a throw that allowed Woodward to score from third to put the Braves up, 3–1. Bourne never looked back. Starter Eric Cantrell tossed five plus, then gave way to Logan Billbrough and closer Kevin Munson, who shut down the Kettleers' attack. Bourne took it, 5–1, to complete the sweep and earn the Braves' first CCBL title, and the first for a Bourne team since the 1965 Sagamore club. Roller took home playoff MVP honors, having hit .500 with eight RBIs in the postseason.

==== The 2010s ====
The Braves reached the playoffs in nine of ten years in the 2010s, advancing to the West Division finals five times. Bourne was back in the title series in 2017, but was downed by Brewster in a matchup of the two 1988 expansion franchises. Skipper Harvey Shapiro continued to pilot the team throughout the decade, his total years with the Braves surpassing the total of all previous managers combined.

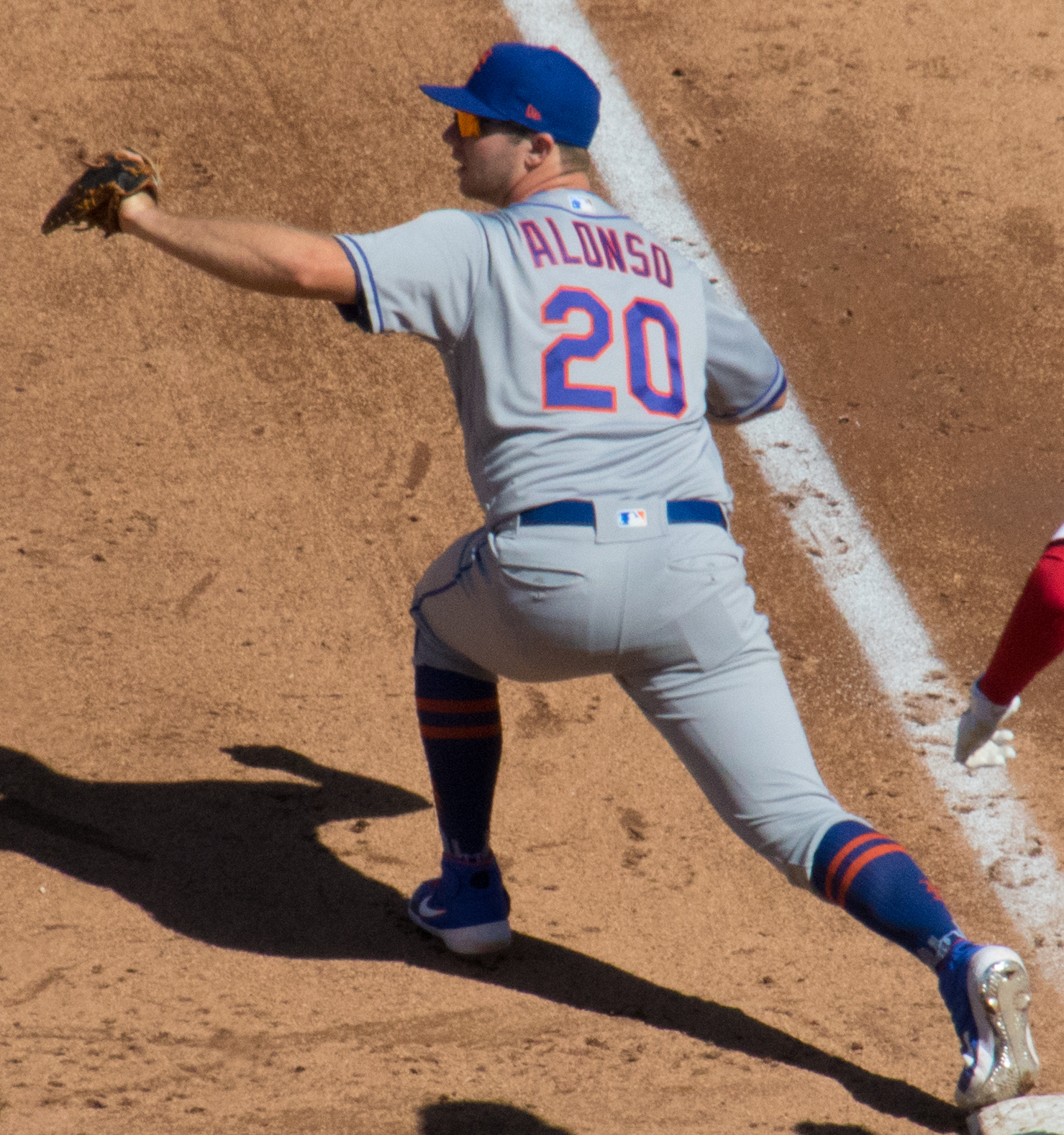
Slugger Pete Alonso played for Bourne in 2015.

In 2010, Bourne featured the league's Outstanding Pro Prospect and Outstanding Relief Pitcher, Tony Zych. Zych allowed only two runs while striking out 29 in 20.1 innings, posting an 0.89 ERA with 12 saves, and contributing a shutout inning in the CCBL All-Star Game. Joining Zych on the 2010 staff was the league's Outstanding Pitcher, Grayson Garvin, who went 5–0 with a league-leading 0.74 ERA in 36.2 innings. The Outstanding Pitcher Award went to a Brave for a second consecutive season when Ryan Eades took the 2011 honor. Eades posted a 3–0 record with an 0.84 ERA in 32.1 innings, and was the West Division starting pitcher at the CCBL All-Star Game.

Bourne boasted the league MVP twice in the decade, as CCBL Hall of Famers Travis Jankowski and Max Pentecost took home the honor in 2011 and 2013 respectively. Jankowski hit .329 and stole 15 bases, and led the league in hits, runs and triples. Pentecost was among the league leaders in all three triple crown categories, finishing with a .346 average, 6 homers and 29 RBIs. Braves hurler Jeff Thompson spun a no-hitter in a rain-shortened six-inning game against Harwich at Doran Park in 2012, and pitchers Austin Gomber, Josh Laxer, and Ryan Harris teamed up for a combined no-hitter at Cotuit in 2013.

Bourne's Spencer Brickhouse was West Division MVP at the 2018 CCBL All-Star Game, going 2-for-2 with a homer, double and two RBI's in the West's 4–3 victory. A pair of Braves hurlers were named co-recipients of the league's Outstanding New England Player Award in 2018, as Justin Lasko of Stratford, Connecticut and the University of Massachusetts shared the honor with Methuen, Massachusetts native Jacob Wallace of the University of Connecticut. University of Hartford lefty Nick Dombkowski provided the highlight of the 2019 season when he tossed a perfect game for Bourne in a 5-inning rain-shortened 6–0 win over Yarmouth-Dennis at Doran Park.

==== The 2020s: A trio of Braves championships ====
The 2020 CCBL season was cancelled due to the coronavirus pandemic. Shapiro's 2021 Braves began the season with an 11-game winning streak, followed it up with another 8-game streak later in the season, and finished the regular season in first place atop the West Division, but were downed in the playoff finals by Brewster. After the 2021 season, Shapiro stepped down as Bourne's manager after 18 seasons.

The 2022 Braves were led by first-year pilot Scott Landers and hitting coach and former Boston Red Sox catcher Jarrod Saltalamacchia. Bourne featured league MVP Matt Shaw, who led the league in batting (.360), and became the first CCBL player in 11 years to hit for the cycle when he accomplished the feat at Hyannis. The Braves finished the regular season in first place atop the West Division, and after disposing of Falmouth and Hyannis in the divisional playoffs, met the Brewster Whitecaps in the CCBL championship series for a second consecutive season. Braves skipper Scott Landers, who had been the pitching coach for Brewster during their 2021 finals victory over Bourne, was now poised to help his new club exact its revenge. In Game 1 at Doran Park, the Braves rode a shutout performance by hurlers Matt Duffy and Seth Keener, and scratched out three runs against strong Brewster pitching to take the opener. On the road for Game 2, Bourne jumped out to an early lead with a four-run first inning and never looked back. Shaw and Ryan Enos added late-game homers to give the Braves a series-clinching 8–1 win to secure the club's second CCBL crown of the modern era. Playoff MVP Bryce Eblin batted .458 in the postseason, and went 4-for-5 in the Game 2 finale.

Landers' 2023 Braves returned playoff star Eblin, Joshua Kuroda-Grauer, and pitcher Bryce Cunningham, and also featured sluggers Garrett Michel and CCBL All-Star Game MVP Derek Bender. After a fourth place regular season finish, Bourne swept first-place Cotuit in the opening round of playoffs to meet Hyannis in the West Division finals for a second consecutive season. After dropping Game 1 at McKeon Park, the Braves took Game 2, 13–3, behind back-to-back homers by Bender and Michel. Bender went deep again in Game 3 as Bourne's 12–4 victory earned the club a return trip to the CCBL finals to face East Division champ Orleans. Game 1 of the championship series featured a starting pitchers' matchup of Vanderbilt teammates Cunningham and Orleans' Greysen Carter, with the Braves prevailing, 6–4. Bourne dropped Game 2 at home, 4–3, sending the series to a decisive Game 3 at Eldredge Park. Bourne starter Trystan Levesque allowed a pair of solo homers to Firebirds second baseman Jo Oyama early, and the Braves trailed, 2–0, after three innings. Bourne got one run back in the fourth, then took the lead on a Bender RBI double as part of a three-run sixth inning rally. Bender added an insurance run in the eighth on a solo homer, and Anthony DeFabbia nailed it down in relief with four and a third scoreless innings, sealing the Braves' 5–2 win and second consecutive league title. Eblin finished the playoffs with a team record 23-game hitting streak, and Kuroda-Grauer, who hit .444 with two homers and 13 RBI in the postseason, was named playoff MVP.

Although finishing the regular season just above the .500 mark, Landers' 2025 Braves nevertheless claimed first place in the West Division, and overcame first-round playoff opponent Hyannis to earn a spot in the West finals against Cotuit. After splitting the first two games of the divisional finals series with the Kettleers, Bourne returned home for the decisive Game 3, and found themselves late in the game on the brink of elimination. Down a run with two outs in the bottom of the ninth inning, Jason Torres lined a single that scored Ryker Waite, tying the game an instant before Ryan Cooney was thrown out at third base to end the inning. As the game moved into extra frames, Bourne's lefty reliever Will Whelan continued to keep Cotuit bats silent, working 5 1/3 shutout innings, and Gavin Kelly provided the series-winning heroics in the bottom of the 12th with a drive down the left field line that scored Jon LeGrande and sent the Braves to the CCBL championship series. After downing Yarmouth-Dennis, 5–3, in Game 1 of the finals at Doran Park, the Braves completed the series sweep on the road, steamrolling the Red Sox by a 19–2 tally in Game 2. The win marked the third league championship for Bourne in a four-year span, and Braves slugger LeGrande was named playoff MVP, posting a .444 batting average with five RBI's and four stolen bases over eight games.

== CCBL Hall of Fame inductees ==
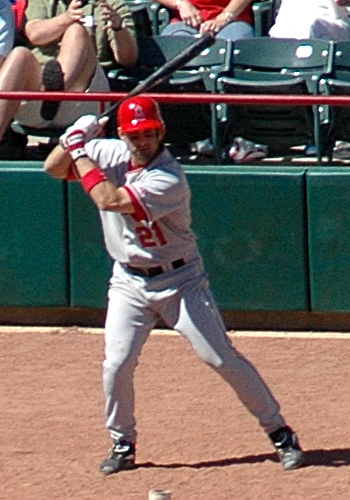
CCBL Hall of Famer Lou Merloni

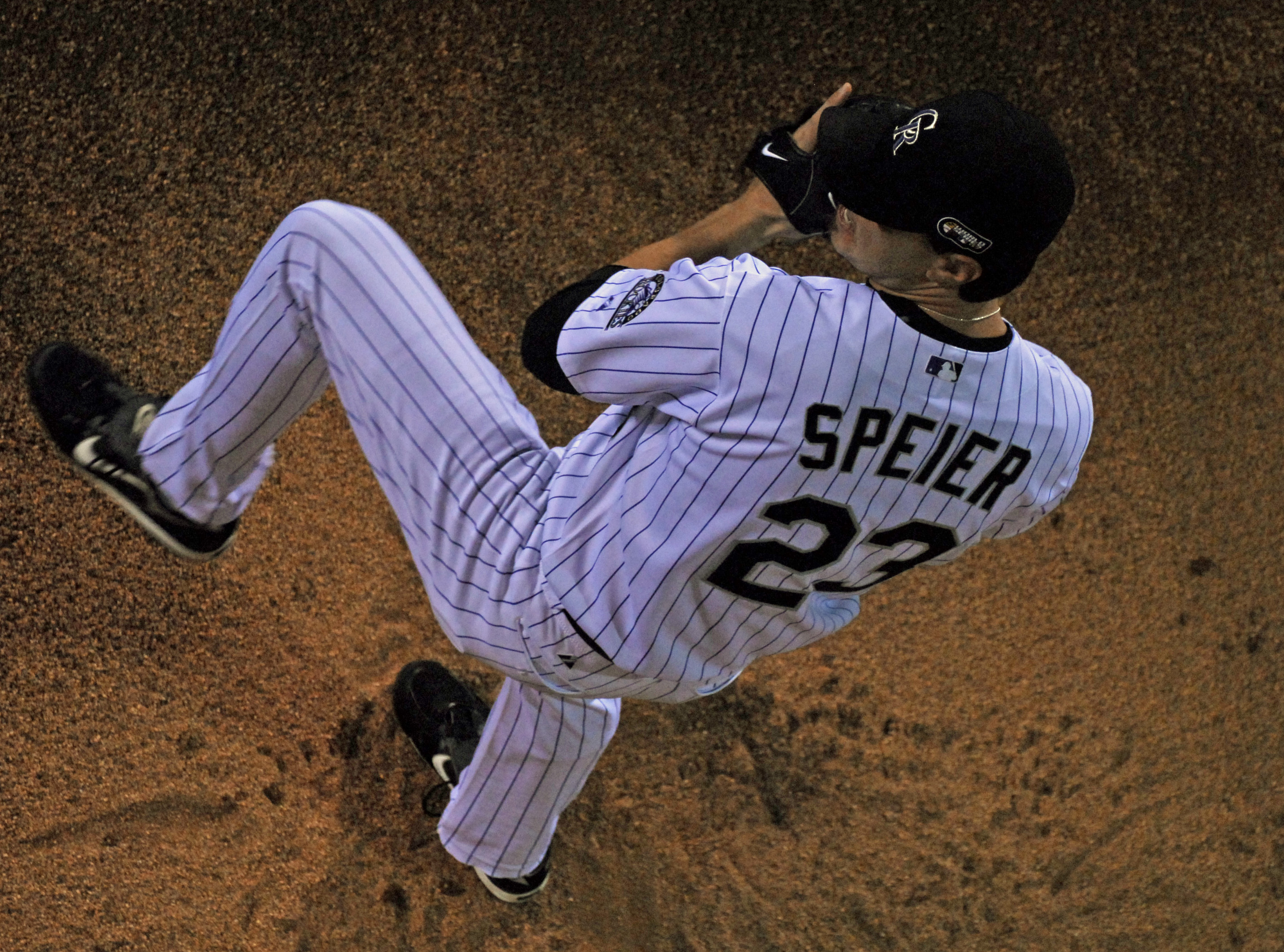
CCBL Hall of Famer Ryan Speier

The CCBL Hall of Fame and Museum is a history museum and hall of fame honoring past players, coaches, and others who have made outstanding contributions to the CCBL. Below are the inductees who spent all or part of their time in the Cape League with Bourne.

Year Inducted	Ref.	Name	Position
2001		Tony Plansky	Player / Manager
2002		George Karras	Player / Manager
2003		Noel Kinski	Player
2003		Pat Sorenti	Manager / Executive
2004		Tello Tontini	Player
2004		John Caneira	Player
2005		Manny Pena	Player / Manager
2005		Jack Sanford	Player
2007		Dick Licini	Player
2007		Bob Schaefer	Player / Manager
2009		Lou Lamoriello	Player / Manager
2010		Wayne Granger	Player
2010		Lou Merloni	Player
2011		Bill Wissler	Player
2012		John "Jack" Aylmer	Executive
2012		Dan DeMichele	Player
2013		Jim Prete	Player
2013		Ryan Speier	Player
2014		Eric Beattie	Player
2016		Kyle Roller	Player
2017		Chuck Sturtevant	Executive
2020		Bob Corradi	Executive
2020		Harry Nelson	Player
2020		Harvey Shapiro	Manager
2023		Max Pentecost	Player
2025		Travis Jankowski	Player
2025		Bob Stead	Manager

== Notable alumni ==
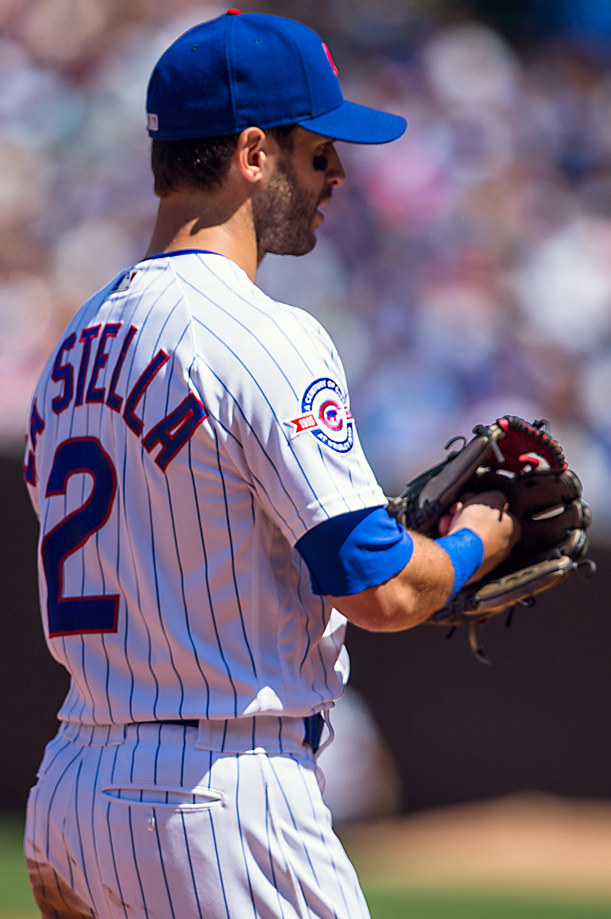
Tommy La Stella

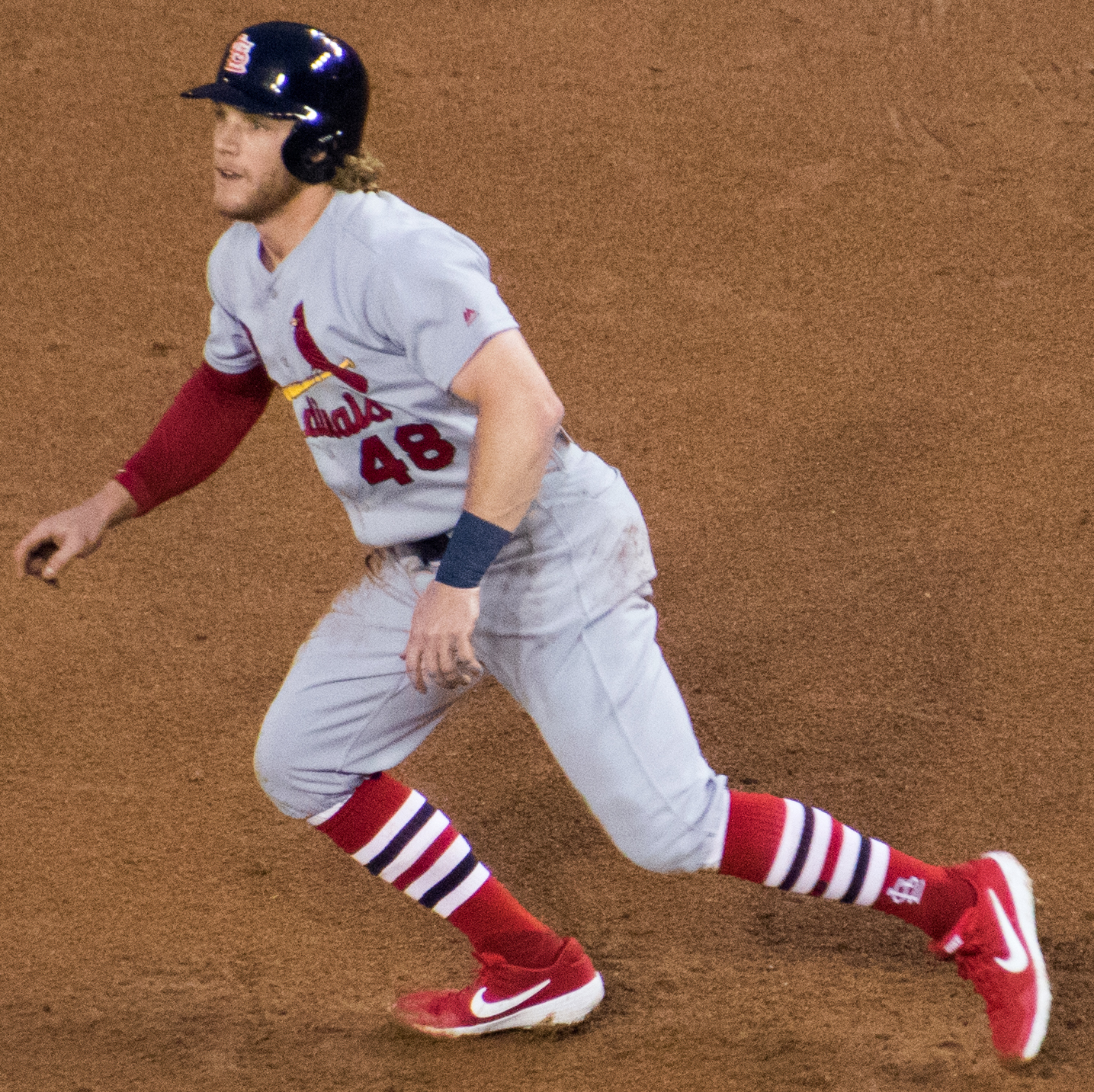
Harrison Bader

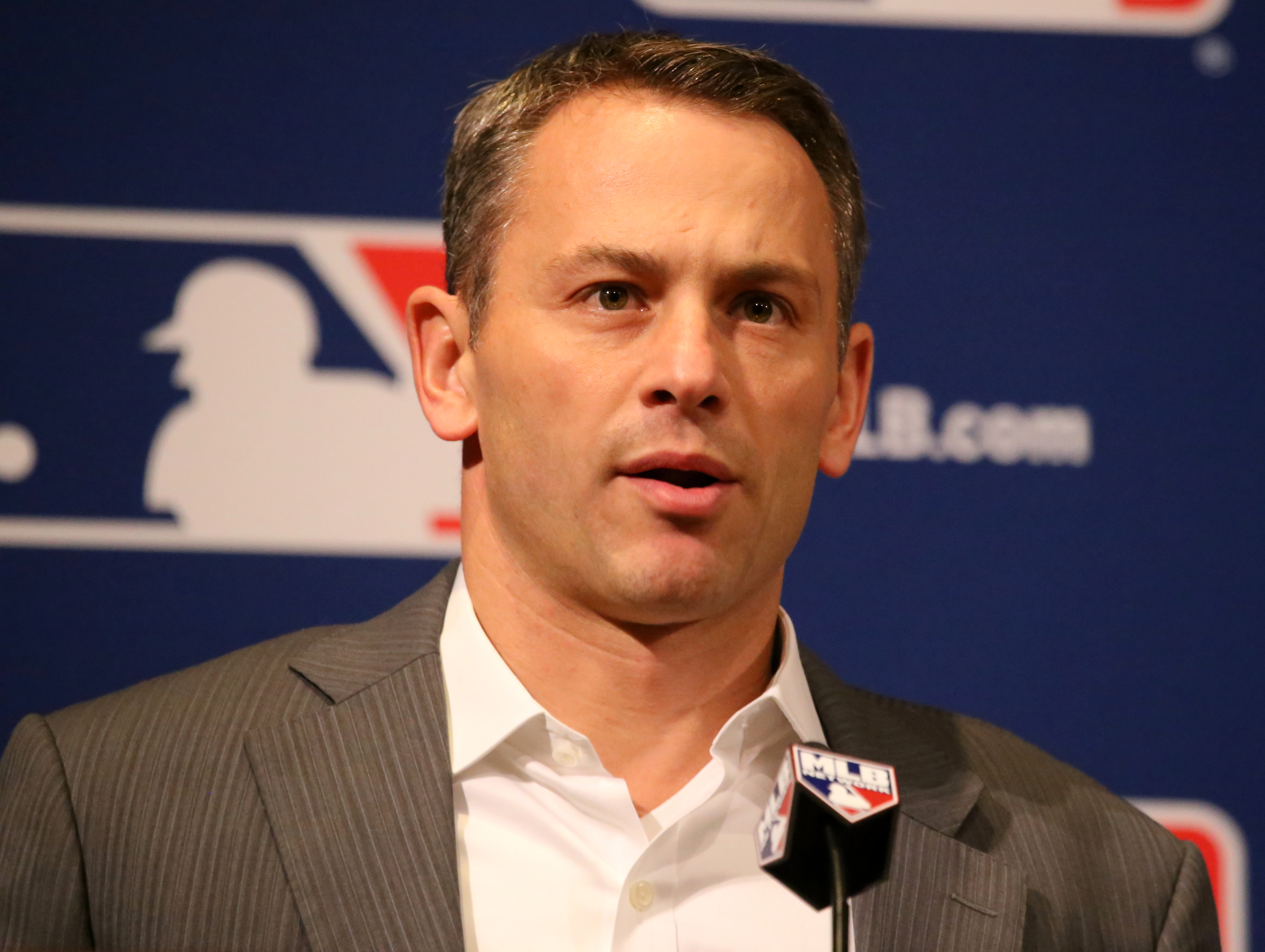
Jed Hoyer

- Zach Agnos 2021
- Nick Ahmed 2010
- Keegan Akin 2015
- Pete Alonso 2015
- Jake Alu 2017
- R.J. Alvarez 2010–2011
- Brian Anderson 2001
- Max Anderson 2021
- Harrison Bader 2014
- Bryan Baker 2015
- Brandon Bantz 2008
- Mike Bell 1993
- Jake Bennett 2021
- Travis Bergen 2014
- Vic Black 2008
- Joe Blanton 2001
- Caden Bodine 2023–2024
- Brennan Boesch 2005
- Ryan Boldt 2015
- Justin Bour 2008
- Alec Burleson 2019
- Daniel Cabrera 2018
- Brett Callahan 2023
- John Caneira 1972
- Chris Capuano 1999
- Andrew Carignan 2005–2006
- Tim Cate 2017
- C. J. Chatham 2015
- Billy Cleary 1956–1958
- Bobby Cleary 1956–1958
- Jason Coats 2010
- Dusty Coleman 2008
- Dylan Coleman 2017
- Gavin Collins 2014
- Ethan Conrad 2024
- Reggie Crawford 2021
- Michael Crotta 2005
- Ryan Cusick 2019
- Bob "Red" Daughters 1934–1935
- Henry Davis 2019
- Greg Deichmann 2016
- David DeJesus 1998
- Jason Delay 2015
- Dan DeMichele 1965–1966
- Mark DeRosa 1995
- John Dockery 1965
- Liam Doyle 2023
- Ryan Eades 2011
- Jeremy Eierman 2016–2017
- Josh Ekness 2021
- Logan Evans 2023
- Jud Fabian 2019
- Kyle Farmer 2011
- Kyler Fedko 2019
- Ryan Feltner 2017
- Joe Ferris 1964
- Paco Figueroa 2004
- Tyler Fitzgerald 2017–2018
- Foxy Flumere 1939
- Mike Frank 1994
- Eddie Gaillard 1991
- Herb Gallagher 1939
- Grayson Garvin 2010
- Billy Gasparino 1997
- Jeremy Giambi 1994
- Austin Gomber 2013
- Billy Grabarkewitz 1963
- Gordon Graceffo 2021
- Wayne Granger 1962
- Chad Green 2011–2012
- Justin Grimm 2008
- Ben Guez 2007
- Jerry Hairston Jr. 1996
- Mitch Harris 2007
- Thomas Hatch 2014
- Jimmy Herget 2014
- Jimmy Herron 2016
- Bobby Higginson 1991
- Bryan Hoeing 2017–2018
- Mac Horvath 2022
- Spencer Horwitz 2018
- Marek Houston 2024
- J.P. Howell 2002
- Jed Hoyer 1995
- Logan Hughes 2025
- Tim Hummel 1998
- Brandon Inge 1997
- Joe Inglett 1999
- Conor Jackson 2001
- Travis Jankowski 2010–2011
- Mark P. Johnson 1988–1989
- Corey Julks 2015
- Tommy Kahnle 2010
- Ryan Kellogg 2013
- Grae Kessinger 2018
- Mark Kotsay 1994
- Marc Krauss 2008
- Joshua Kuroda-Grauer 2022–2023
- Tommy La Stella 2010
- Lou Lamoriello 1964
- Justin Lebron 2025
- Casey Legumina 2018
- Lyle Lin 2017
- Brad Lincoln 2005
- Jacob Lindgren 2013
- Brendon Little 2016
- Jaron Long 2012
- Vimael Machín 2014
- David MacKinnon 2016
- Seth Maness 2009
- Jake Mangum 2016
- Richie Martin 2014
- Justin Maxwell 2003
- Mike Mayers 2012
- L. J. Mazzilli 2012
- John McDonald 1995
- Brendan McKay 2015
- Mark McLemore 2001
- Evan Mendoza 2016
- Lou Merloni 1991
- D. J. Mitchell 2007
- Gabe Molina 1994
- Freddie Moncewicz 1934–1935
- Colin Moran 2011–2012
- Mitch Moreland 2006–2007
- Robert Morey 2009
- Mike Morin 2010
- Cody Morissette 2019
- Bill Mueller 1992
- Mark Mulder 1997
- Kevin Munson 2009
- Mason Neville 2024
- Scott Oberg 2009
- Peter O'Brien 2010
- R. C. Orlan 2010
- Micah Owings 2004
- Richie Palacios 2017
- Robb Paller 2015
- Blake Parker 2005
- Jordan Patterson 2012
- John Peck 2022
- Max Pentecost 2013
- Tony Plansky 1933–1939
- Austin Pope 2018
- Justin Pope 2000
- PJ Poulin 2017
- Hugh Quattlebaum 1999
- Luke Raley 2014
- Chris Ray 2002
- Dan Reichert 1995–1996
- Jack Reinheimer 2012
- Greg Reynolds 2004–2005
- Jacob Robson 2015
- Carson Roccaforte 2022
- Josh Rogers 2014–2015
- Kyle Roller 2008–2009
- Stefen Romero 2009
- Braxton Roxby 2019
- Dalton Rushing 2021
- Andrew Saalfrank 2018
- Josh Satin 2007
- Warren Sawkiw 1988–1989
- Bob Schaefer 1965
- Cody Sedlock 2015
- Rob Segedin 2009
- Brian Serven 2014
- Matt Shaw 2022
- Travis Shaw 2010
- Joe Simokaitis 2004
- Eric Skoglund 2013
- Greg Smith 2004
- Tommy Smith 1969
- Nick Solak 2015
- Andrew Sopko 2014
- Ryan Speier 2001
- Ryne Stanek 2011
- Mickey Storey 2006–2007
- Brett Sullivan 2014
- Joe Thatcher 2003
- Jared Theodorakos 2002
- Colby Thomas 2021
- Matt Tolbert 2003–2004
- Devon Travis 2010
- Jared Triolo 2017–2018
- Robert Tyler 2015
- Ron Villone 1992
- Cayden Wallace 2021
- Andrew Wantz 2016
- Robbie Widlansky 2005
- Zander Wiel 2014
- Alika Williams 2018–2019
- Gavin Williams 2018
- Alex Wimmers 2009
- Grant Witherspoon 2017
- Connor Wong 2016
- Austin Wynns 2012
- Kevin Youkilis 2000
- Tony Zych 2010

== Yearly results ==
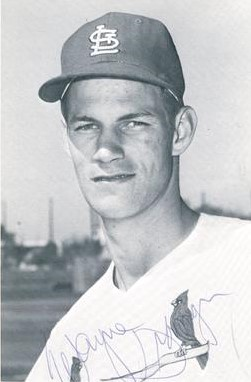
CCBL Hall of Famer Wayne Granger played for Sagamore in 1962

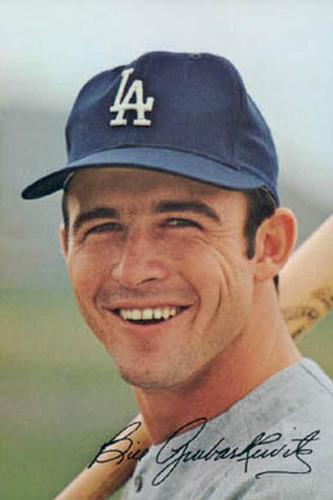
1963 Sagamore Clouter Billy Grabarkewitz

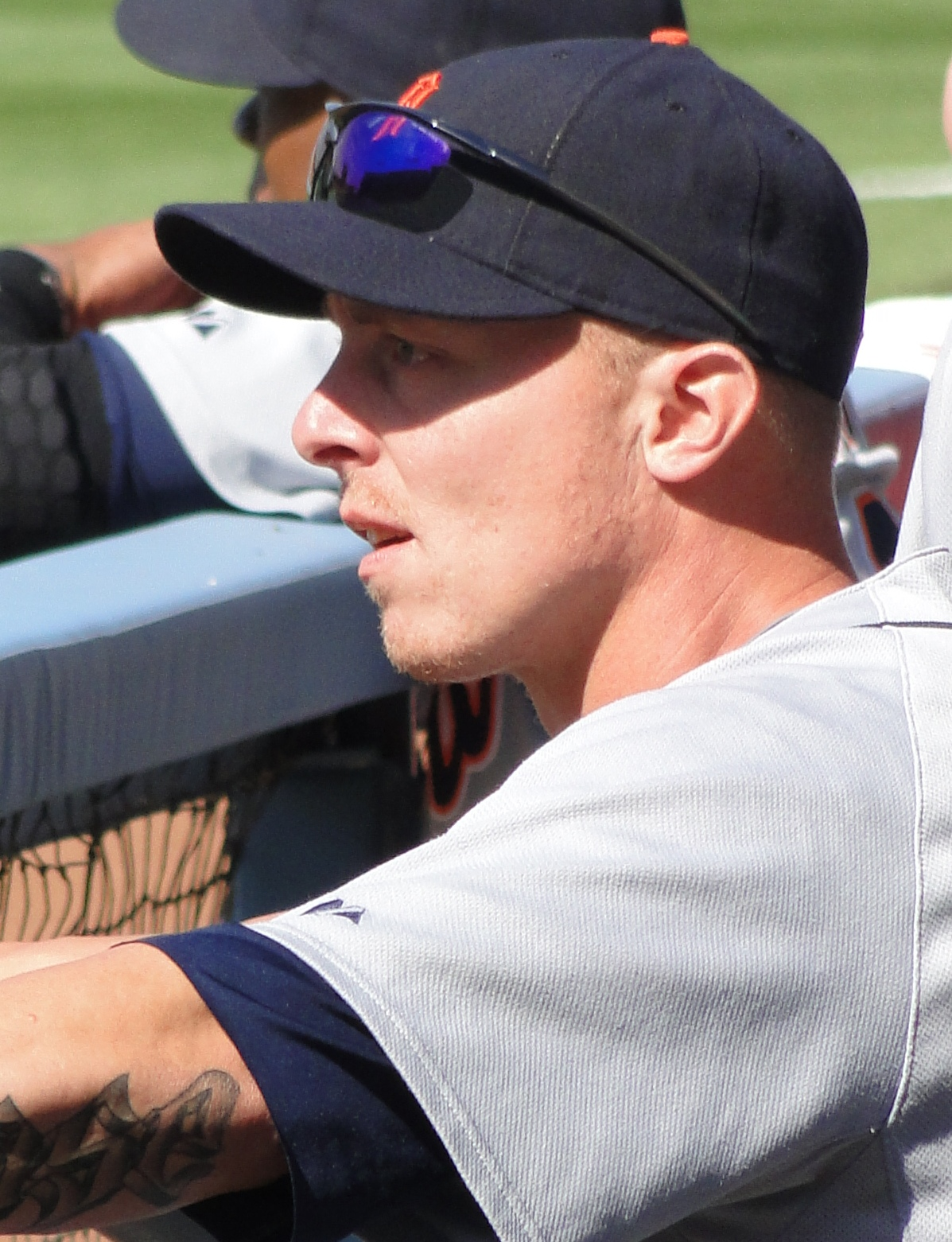
1997 Bourne Brave and future major league all-star Brandon Inge

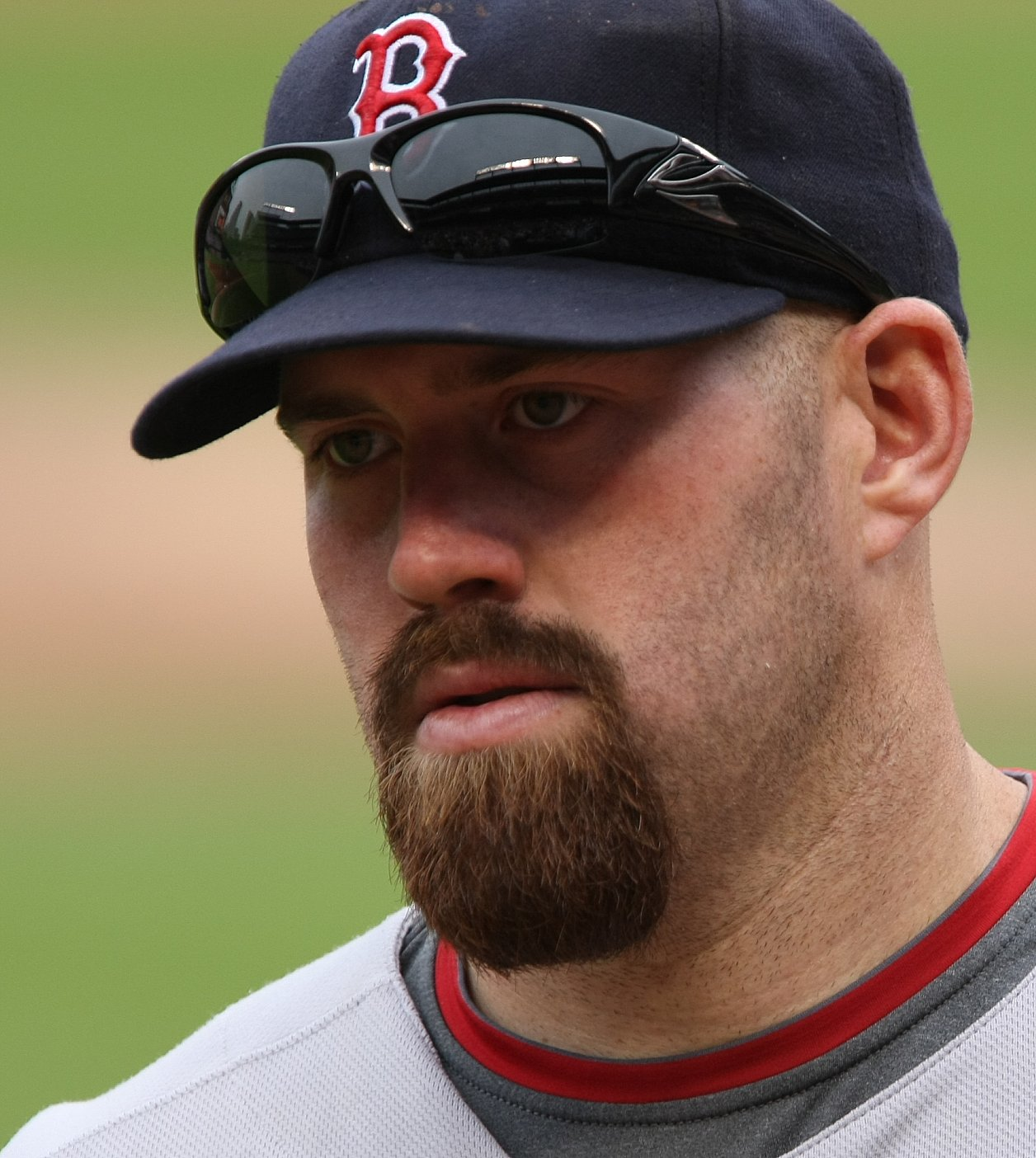
2000 Brave Kevin Youkilis

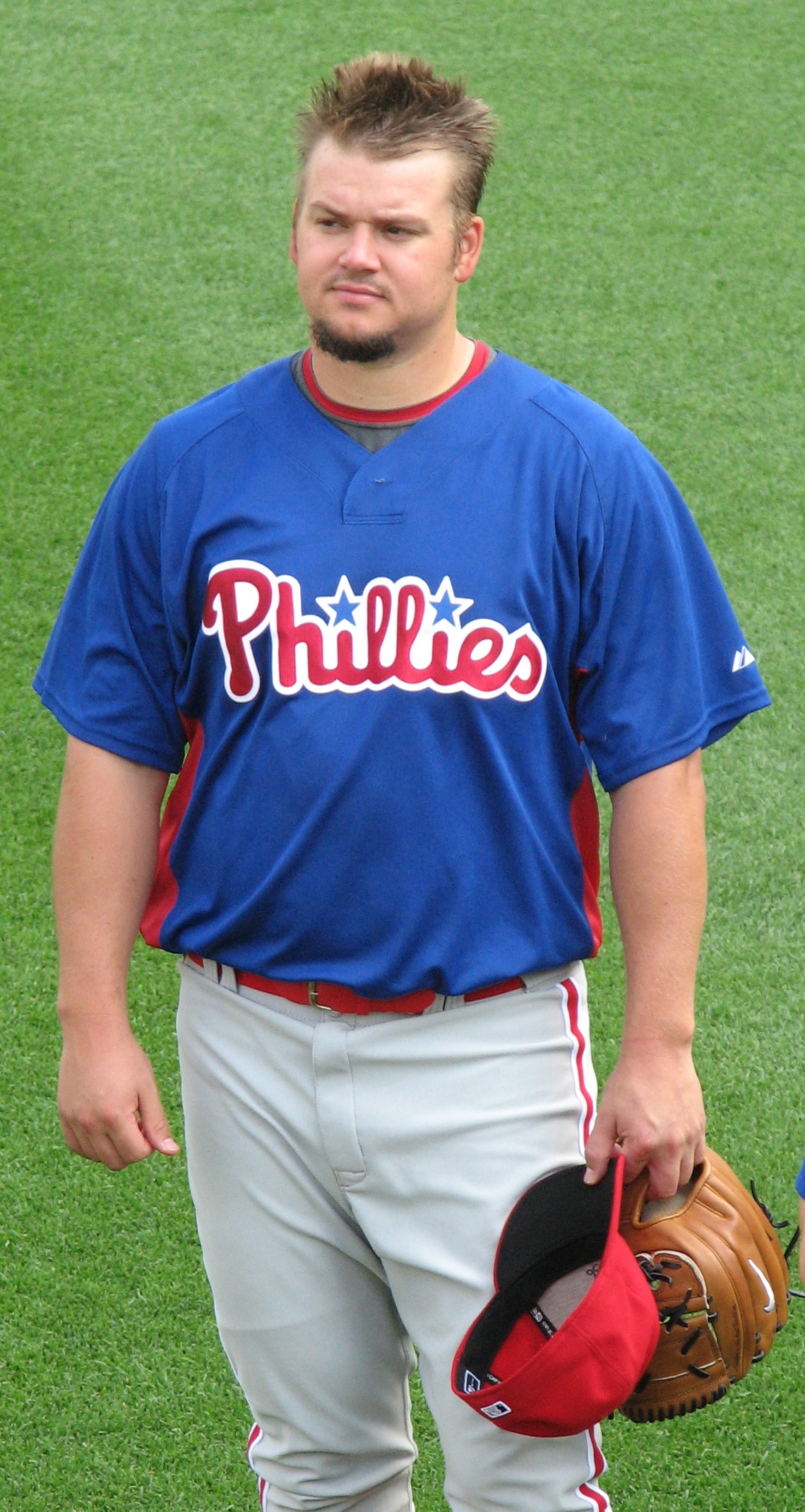
2001 Brave Joe Blanton

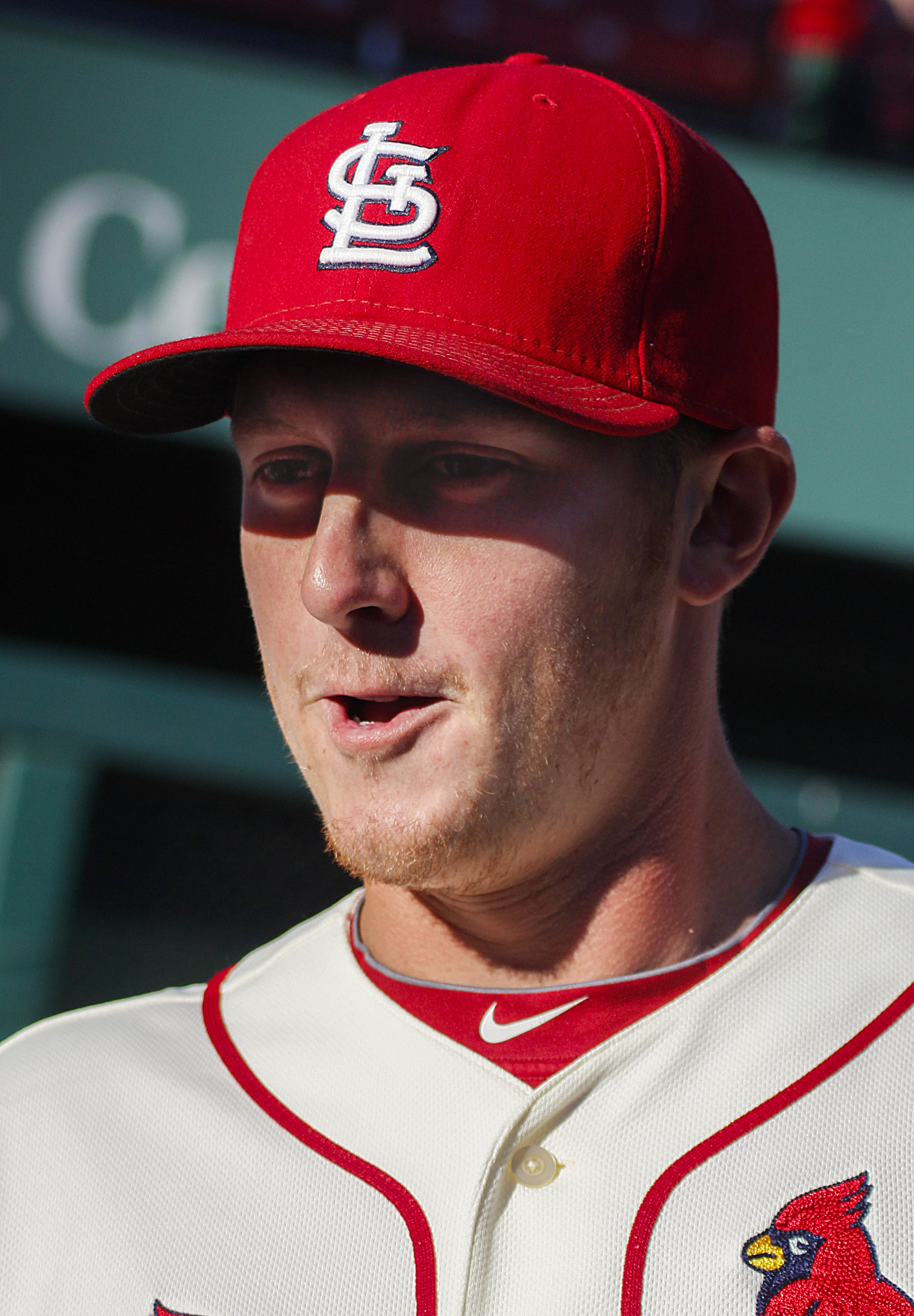
Seth Maness won a CCBL title with the Braves in 2009

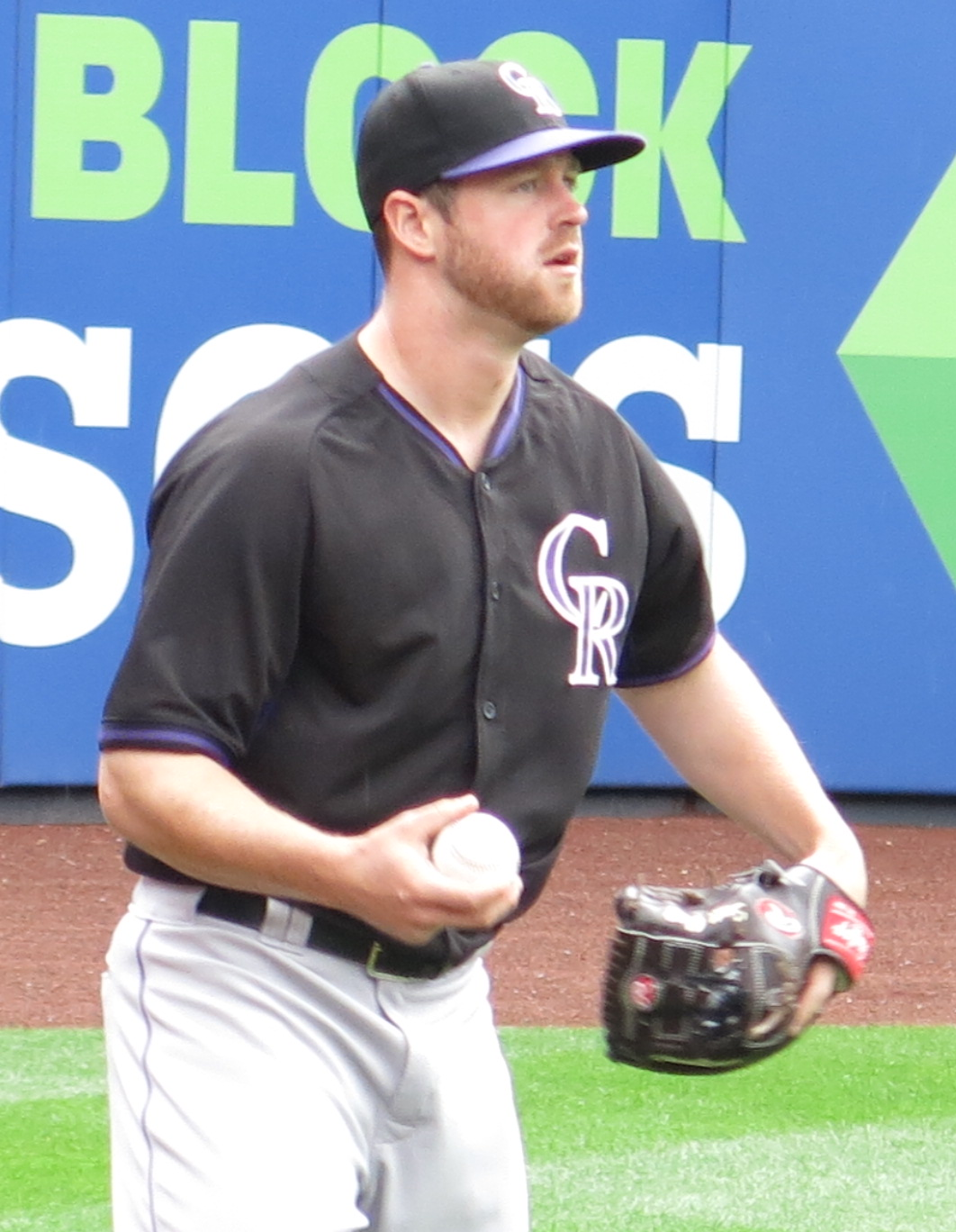
Tewksbury, Massachusetts native Scott Oberg of the 2009 CCBL champion Braves

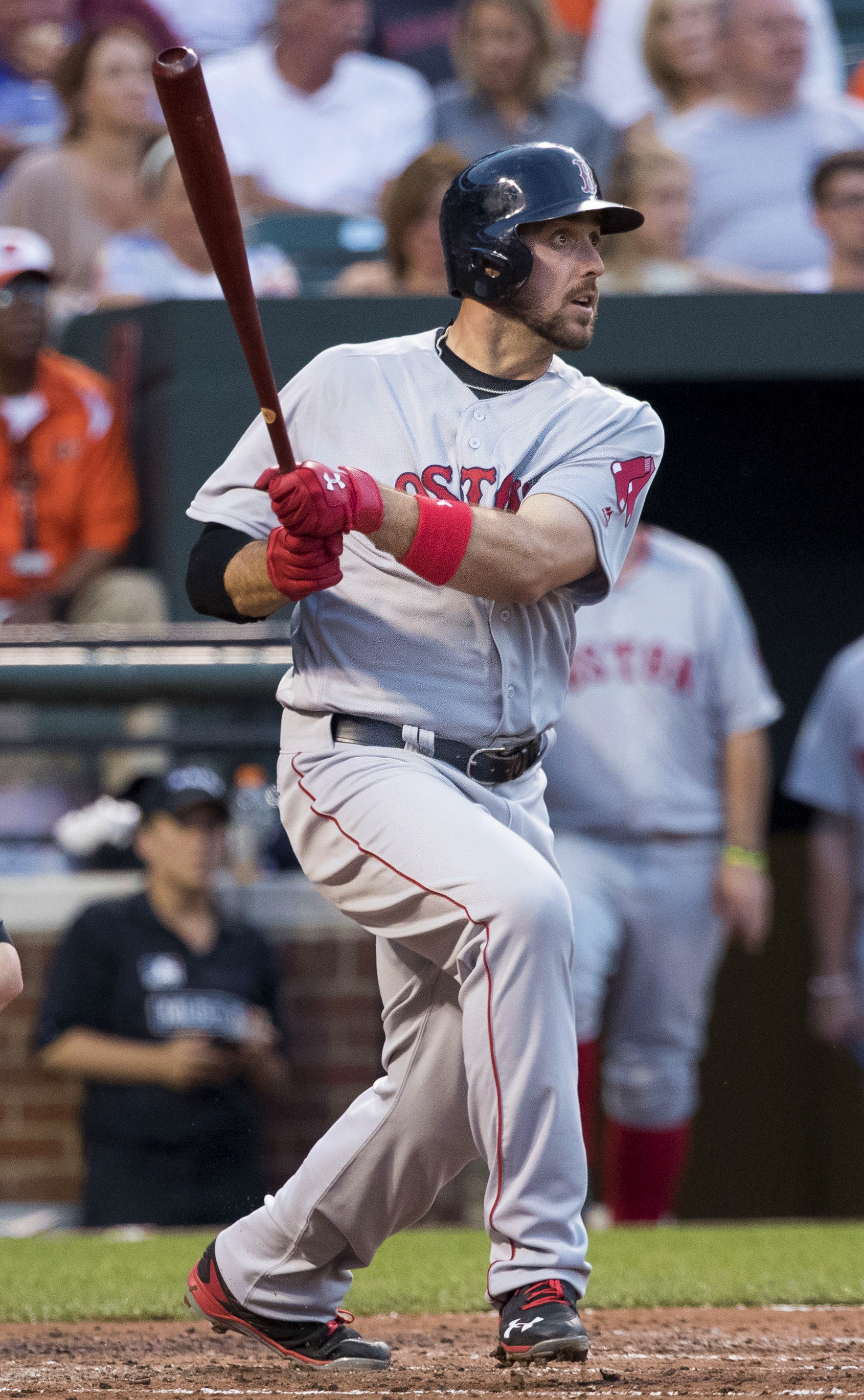
2010 Bourne Brave Travis Shaw

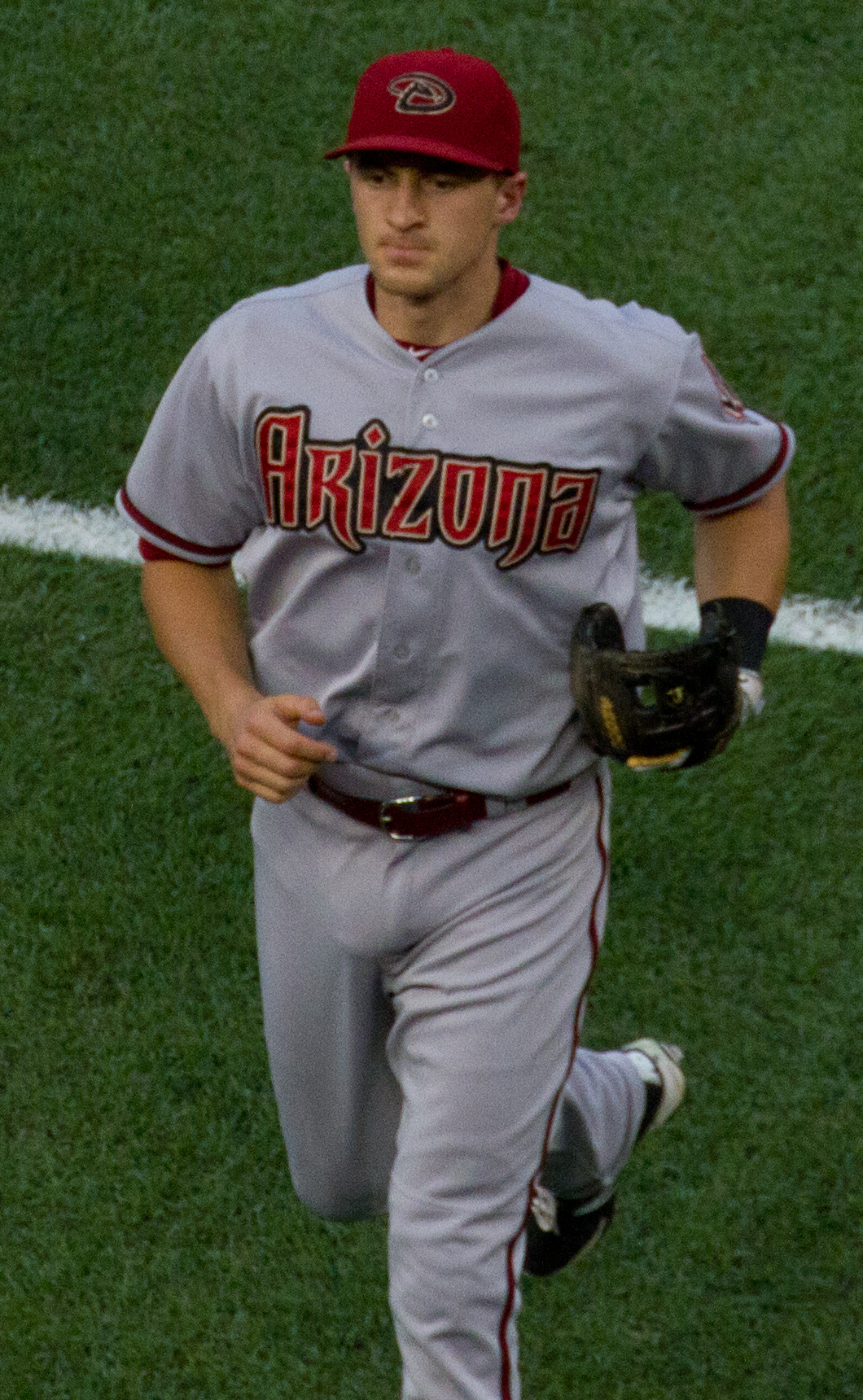
2010 Brave Nick Ahmed

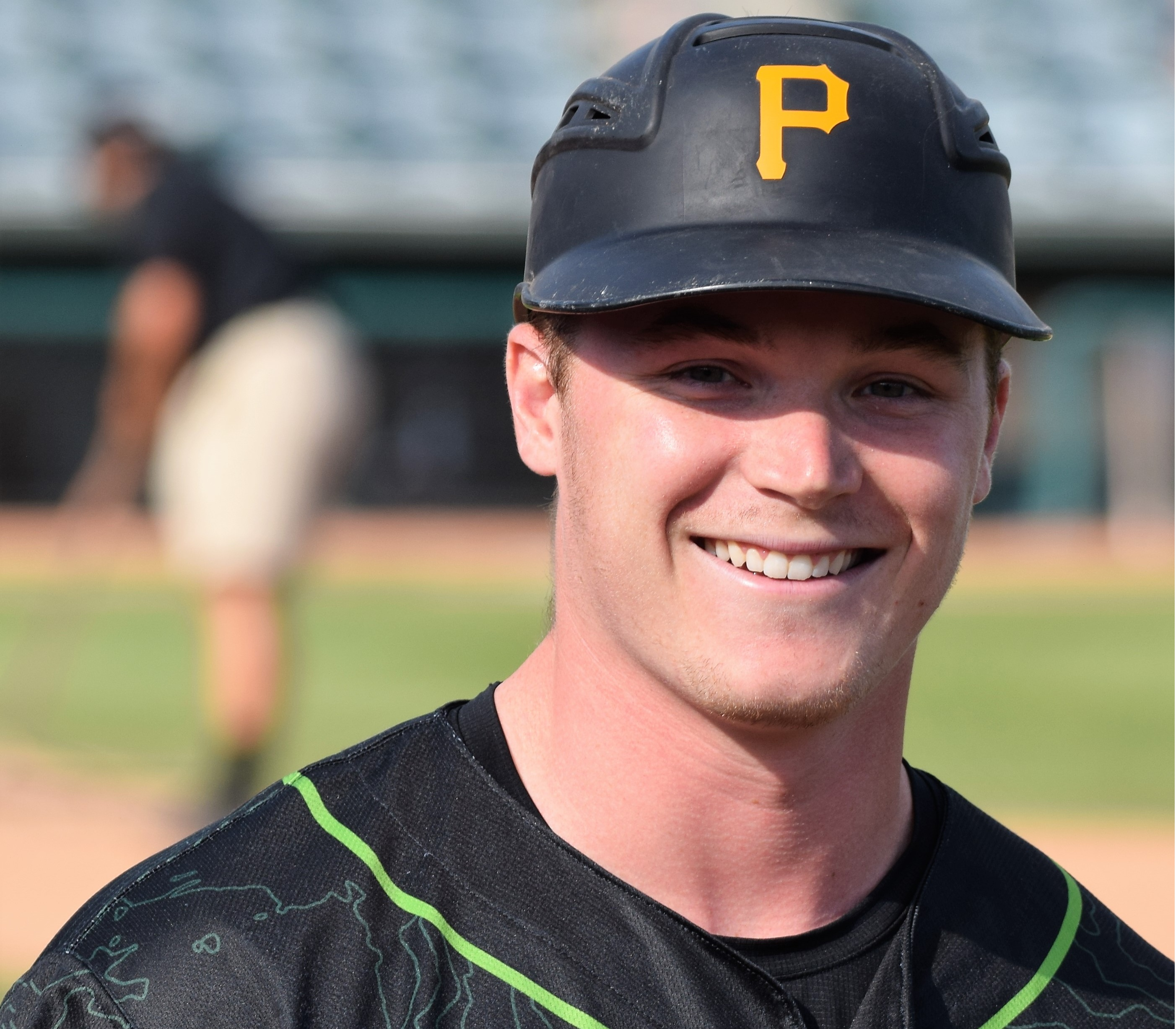
2019 Bourne Brave Henry Davis was selected first overall in the 2021 MLB draft.

=== Results by season, 1933–1939 ===
Year	Won	Lost	Regular Season Finish	Postseason*	Manager	Ref
1933^{†}	1	25	5th League (B)		Jack Fisher	
1934	22	24	3rd League		Jack Fisher	
1935	19	29	3rd League (A); 4th League (B)		Tony Plansky	
1936	30	17	1st League (A); 1st League (B)	Won championship	Larry Donovan	
1937	26	19	3rd League		Larry Donovan	
1938	21	33	4th League		Bill Lane	
1939	23	30	3rd League (A); 4th League (B)		Herb Gallagher	

* During the CCBL's 1923–1939 era, postseason playoffs were a rarity. In most years, the regular season pennant winner was simply crowned as the league champion.
However, there were four years in which the league split its regular season and crowned separate champions for the first (A) and second (B) halves. In two of those
seasons (1936 and 1939), a single team won both halves and was declared overall champion. In the other two split seasons (1933 and 1935), a postseason
playoff series was contested between the two half-season champions to determine the overall champion.
^{†} In 1933, Bourne joined the league mid-season after Provincetown withdrew.

=== Results by season, 1946–1962 ===
Sagamore
Year	Won	Lost	Regular Season Finish*	Postseason	Manager	Ref.
1946				Lost semi-finals (Falmouth)	Pat Sorenti	
1947					Pat Sorenti	
1948					George Karras	
1949					George Karras	
1950	23	9	1st Upper Cape Division (A); T-3rd Upper Cape Division (B)	Won semi-finals (Cotuit); Lost championship (Orleans)	George Karras	
1951	24	10	1st Upper Cape Division (A); 1st Upper Cape Division (B)	Won championship (Orleans)	George Karras	
1952				Lost championship (Orleans)	George Karras	
1953	25	11	2nd Upper Cape Division (A); 1st Upper Cape Division (B)	Won semi-finals (Mass. Maritime); Lost championship (Orleans)	George Karras	
1954				Won semi-finals (Cotuit); Won championship (Orleans)	George Karras	
1955				Lost semi-finals (Cotuit)	Jack Sanford	
1956	22	13	4th Upper Cape Division	Won round 1 (Wareham); Won semi-finals (Cotuit); Won championship (Dennis)	Manny Pena	
1957	14	16	3rd Upper Cape Division	Lost round 1 (Cotuit)	Manny Pena	
1958	21	5	1st Upper Cape Division (A); 1st Upper Cape Division (B)	Lost championship (Yarmouth)	Manny Pena	
1959	26	5	1st Upper Cape Division (A); 1st Upper Cape Division (B)	Won championship (Orleans)	Manny Pena	
1960	20	8	3rd Upper Cape Division	Won round 1 (Falmouth); Won semi-finals (Cotuit); Lost championship (Yarmouth)	Manny Pena	
1961	19	11	2nd Upper Cape Division	Lost round 1 (Falmouth)	Manny Pena	
1962	16	14	2nd Upper Cape Division (T)	Won round 1 (Wareham); Lost semi-finals (Cotuit)	Jack McDonough	

Bourne
Year	Won	Lost	Regular Season Finish*	Postseason	Manager	Ref.
1946						
1947				Lost semi-finals (Mashpee)	Bill Crump	
1948						
1949					Al Gagnon	
1950	11	19	6th Upper Cape Division (A); 8th Upper Cape Division (B)			
1951– 1960	Did not play					
1961	10	18	6th Upper Cape Division		Gabe Mottla	
1962	15	15	4th Upper Cape Division	Lost round 1 (Cotuit)	Gabe Mottla	

* Regular seasons split into first and second halves are designated as (A) and (B).

=== Results by season, 1963–1972 ===
Sagamore (1963–1966)
Year	Won	Lost	Tied	Regular Season Finish	Postseason	Manager
1963	6	27	0	5th Upper Cape Division		Bill Hendy
1964	4	29	0	5th Upper Cape Division		Ken Clarke
1965	25	9	0	1st Upper Cape Division	Won championship (Chatham)	Lou Lamoriello
1966	17	17	0	2nd Upper Cape Division		Charlie Duchesney; Ken Clarke

Bourne
Year	Won	Lost	Tied	Regular Season Finish	Postseason	Manager
1963	21	11	0	2nd Upper Cape Division	Lost round 1 (Wareham)	Charlie Duchesney
1964	18	15	0	2nd Upper Cape Division		Lou Lamoriello
1965	Did not play					
1966	Did not play					
1967	12	27	0	3rd Upper Cape Division (T)		William F. Homan
1968	20	20	0	2nd Upper Cape Division		Rick Doherty
1969	13	30	0	4th Upper Cape Division		Rick Doherty
1970	Did not play					
1971	16	25	0	7th League		Bob Schaefer
1972	14	25	0	7th League		Bob Schaefer

=== Results by season, 1988–present ===
Year	Won	Lost	Tied	Regular Season Finish	Postseason	Manager
1988	12	29	0	5th West Division		Jim Watkins
1989	24	17	3	1st West Division	Lost semi-finals (Hyannis)	Jim Watkins
1990	19	24	1	4th West Division		Jim Watkins
1991	20	20	4	4th West Division		Bob Gendron
1992	19	23	1	3rd West Division		Bob Gendron
1993	15	28	1	5th West Division		Bob Gendron
1994	12	28	3	5th West Division		Nino Giarratano; Bob Stead
1995	18	23	3	4th West Division		Bob Stead
1996	18	25	1	5th West Division		Bob Stead
1997	25	17	2	2nd West Division	Lost semi-finals (Wareham)	Kevin O'Sullivan
1998	20	21	3	2nd West Division	Lost semi-finals (Wareham)	Jayson King
1999	23	20	1	3rd West Division		Mike Rikard
2000	13	29	1	5th West Division		Mike Rikard
2001	23	18	3	2nd West Division	Lost semi-finals (Wareham)	Spencer Graham
2002	16	24	4	4th West Division		Matt Noone
2003	23	19	1	1st West Division	Won semi-finals (Hyannis); Lost championship (Orleans)	Harvey Shapiro
2004	19	24	1	5th West Division		Harvey Shapiro
2005	26	17	1	1st West Division	Won semi-finals (Cotuit); Lost championship (Orleans)	Harvey Shapiro
2006	9	32	2	5th West Division		Harvey Shapiro
2007	25	17	2	1st West Division	Lost semi-finals (Falmouth)	Harvey Shapiro
2008	23	20	1	2nd West Division (T)	Lost play-in game (Falmouth)	Harvey Shapiro
2009	25	17	2	1st West Division	Won semi-finals (Orleans); Won championship (Cotuit)	Harvey Shapiro
2010	24	20	0	1st West Division	Lost round 1 (Wareham)	Harvey Shapiro
2011	22	20	2	2nd West Division (T)	Lost round 1 (Wareham)	Harvey Shapiro
2012	17	27	0	4th West Division	Won round 1 (Cotuit); Lost semi-finals (Wareham)	Harvey Shapiro
2013	21	21	1	4th West Division	Won round 1 (Hyannis); Lost semi-finals (Cotuit)	Harvey Shapiro
2014	28	15	1	1st West Division	Lost round 1 (Cotuit)	Harvey Shapiro
2015	22	20	2	2nd West Division	Won round 1 (Wareham); Lost semi-finals (Hyannis)	Harvey Shapiro
2016	21	21	2	3rd West Division	Won round 1 (Wareham); Lost semi-finals (Falmouth)	Harvey Shapiro
2017	22	22	0	3rd West Division	Won round 1 (Cotuit); Won semi-finals (Wareham); Lost championship (Brewster)	Harvey Shapiro
2018	18	25	1	5th West Division		Harvey Shapiro
2019	18	24	2	4th West Division	Lost round 1 (Falmouth)	Harvey Shapiro
2020	Season cancelled due to coronavirus pandemic					
2021	24	9	3	1st West Division	Won semi-finals (Cotuit); Lost championship (Brewster)	Harvey Shapiro
2022	23	14	7	1st West Division	Won round 1 (Falmouth); Won semi-finals (Hyannis); Won championship (Brewster)	Scott Landers
2023	23	20	1	4th West Division	Won round 1 (Cotuit); Won semi-finals (Hyannis); Won championship (Orleans)	Scott Landers
2024	21	16	3	2nd West Division (T)	Won round 1 (Hyannis); Won semi-finals (Cotuit); Lost championship (Harwich)	Scott Landers
2025	20	18	2	1st West Division	Won round 1 (Hyannis); Won semi-finals (Cotuit); Won championship (Y-D)	Scott Landers
2026	18	19	3	2nd West Division	Won round 1 (Falmouth); Won semi-finals (Hyannis); Lost championship (Harwich)	Scott Landers

== League award winners ==
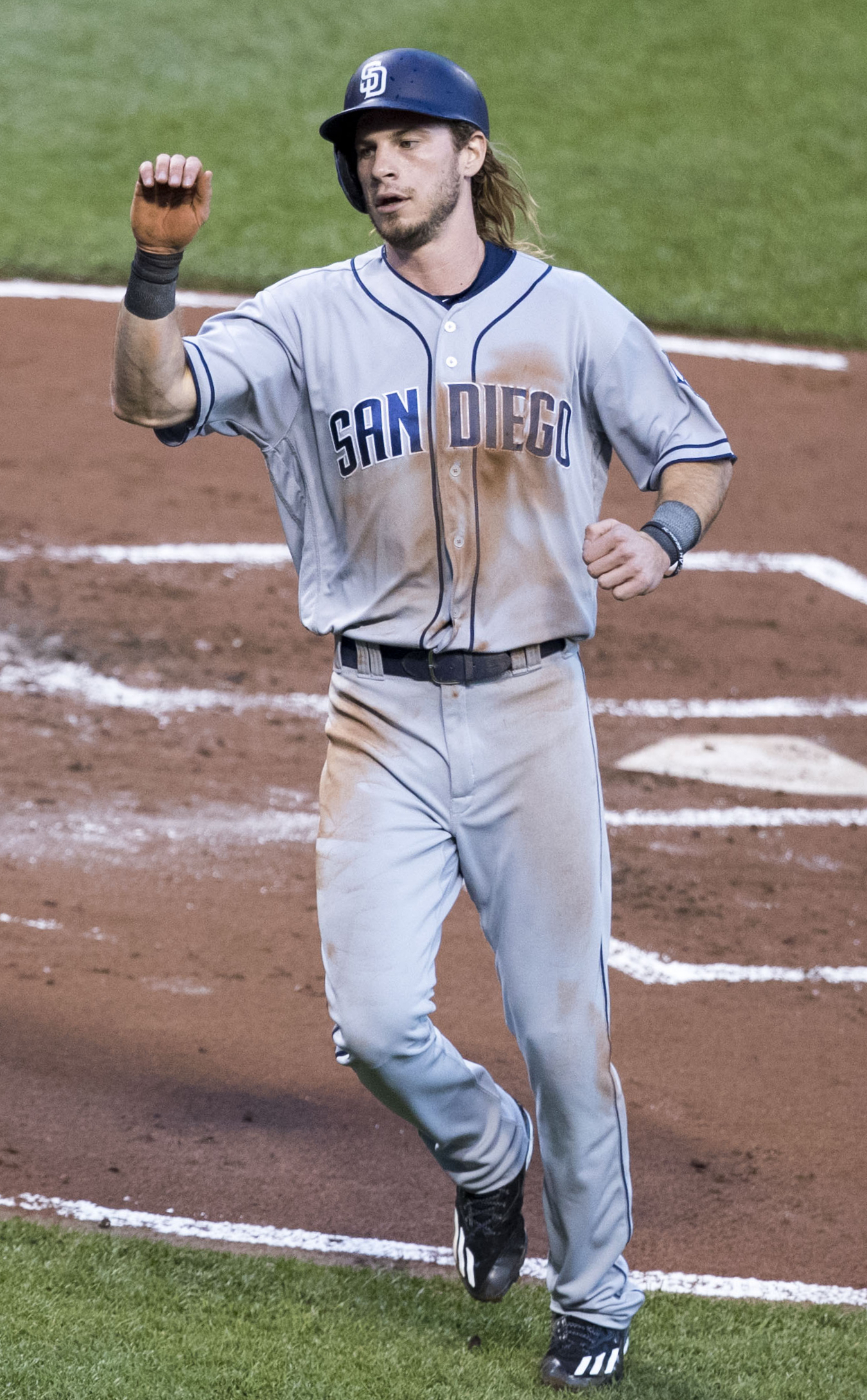
The Braves' Travis Jankowski was CCBL league MVP in 2011

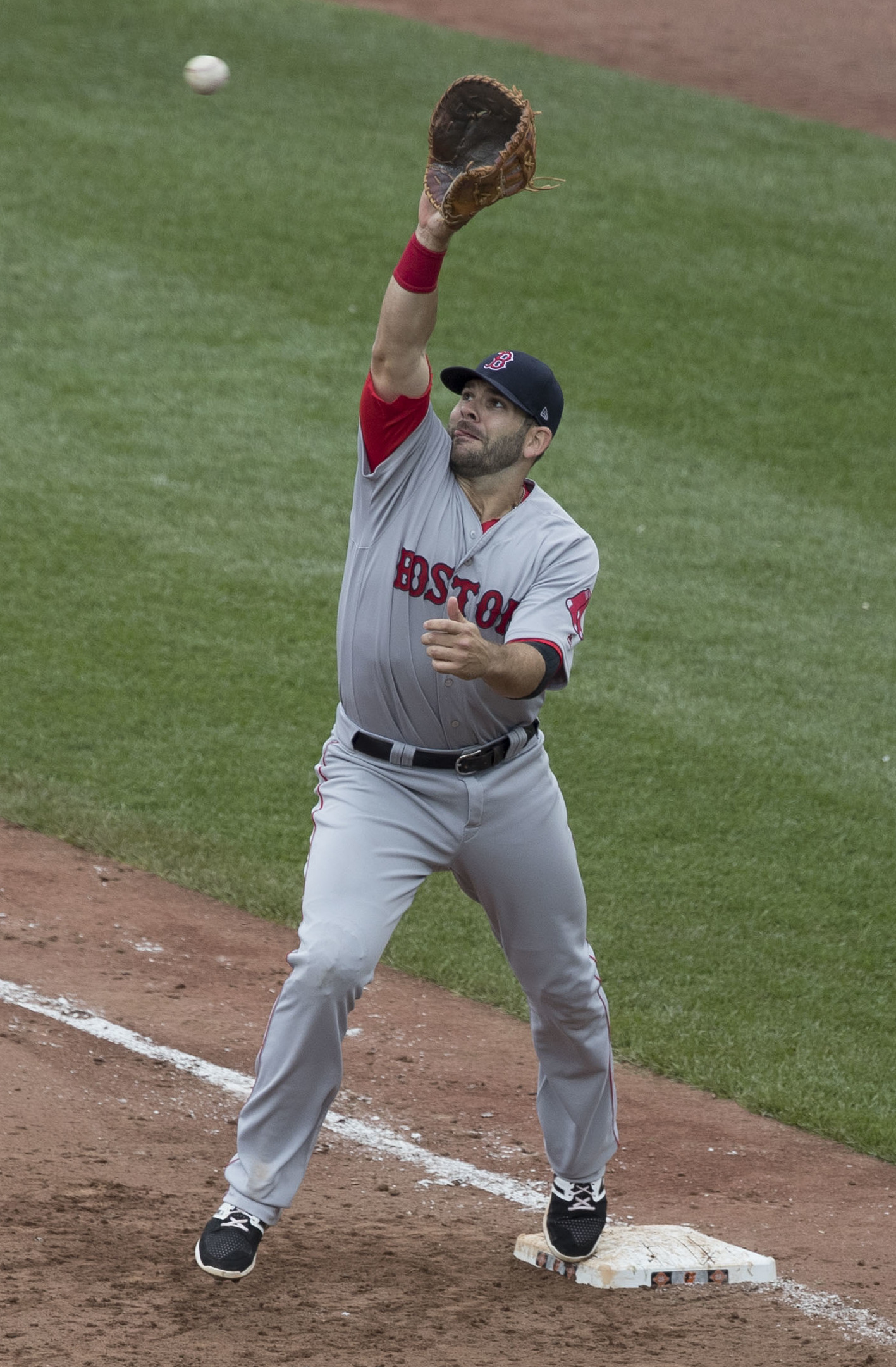
Bourne's Mitch Moreland won the CCBL home run derby in 2006

The Pat Sorenti MVP Award
Year	Player
1965	Ron Bugbee (Sag.)
1968	Dick Licini
2009	Kyle Roller
2011	Travis Jankowski
2013	Max Pentecost
2022	Matt Shaw

The Robert A. McNeece Outstanding Pro Prospect Award
Year	Player
2010	Tony Zych

The BFC Whitehouse Outstanding Pitcher Award
Year	Player
1965	Noel Kinski (Sag.)
1972	John Caneira
1990	Bill Wissler
1991	Bill Wissler
2003	Eric Beattie
2008	Nick McCully
2010	Grayson Garvin
2011	Ryan Eades

The Russ Ford Outstanding Relief Pitcher Award
Year	Player
1998	Tim Lavigne
2001	Ryan Speier
2010	Tony Zych
2015	Austin Conway*
2017	Ryan Feltner*
2021	Eric Adler

The Daniel J. Silva Sportsmanship Award
Year	Player
2009	Pierre LePage
2011	Patrick Cantwell
2023	Hugh Pinkney

The Manny Robello 10th Player Award
Year	Player
1989	Bob Rivell
1998	Jeff House
2003	Justin Maxwell
2005	Brad Lincoln
2009	Pierre LePage

The John J. Claffey Outstanding New England Player Award
Year	Player
2007	Bill Perry
2016	Willy Yahn
2018	Justin Lasko*
2018	Jacob Wallace*

The Thurman Munson Award for Batting Champion
Year	Player
1964	Harry Nelson (.390)
1968	Dick Licini (.382)
1989	Bob Rivell (.358)
2022	Matt Shaw (.360)
2026	Andrew Costello (.361)

John Wylde General Manager of the year
Year	Player
2026	Matt Karas
2015	Chuck Sturtevant
2014	Chuck Sturtevant

All-Star Game MVP Award
Year	Player
2018	Spencer Brickhouse
2023	Derek Bender
2024	Ethan Conrad

All-Star Home Run Hitting Contest Champion
Year	Player
2004	Austin Easley
2006	Mitch Moreland
2025	Kuhio Aloy

The Star of Stars Playoff MVP Award
Year	Player
2009	Kyle Roller
2022	Bryce Eblin
2023	Joshua Kuroda-Grauer
2025	Jon LeGrande

(*) - Indicates co-recipient

== All-Star Game selections ==
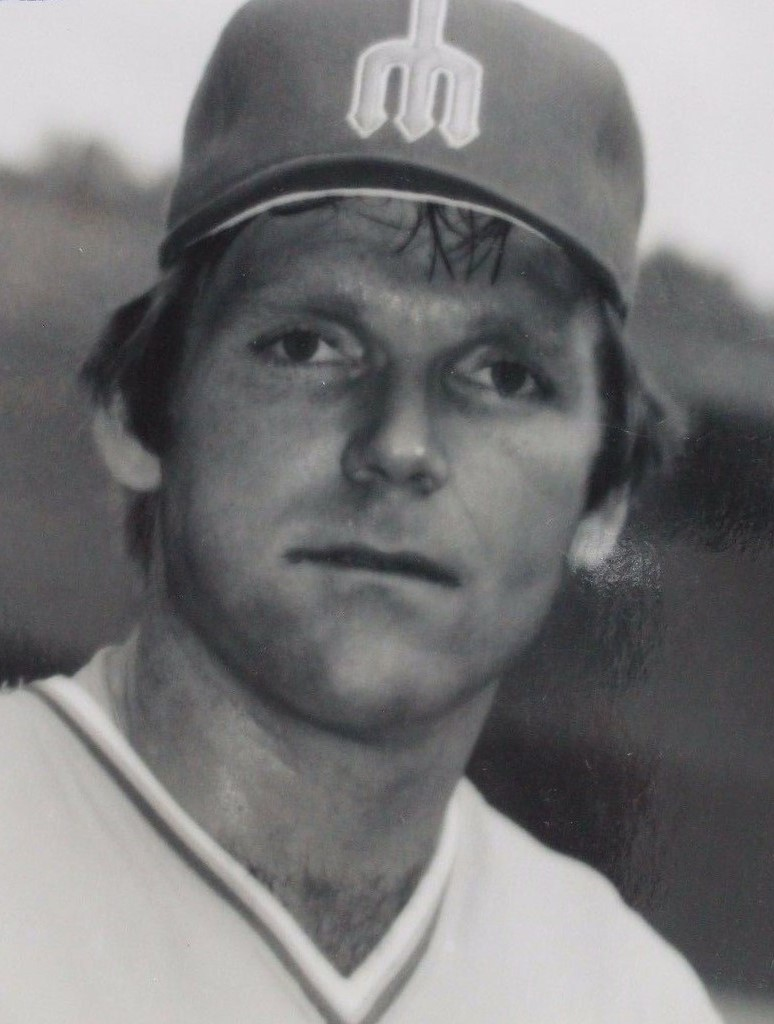
Tommy Smith was an all-star for Bourne in 1969

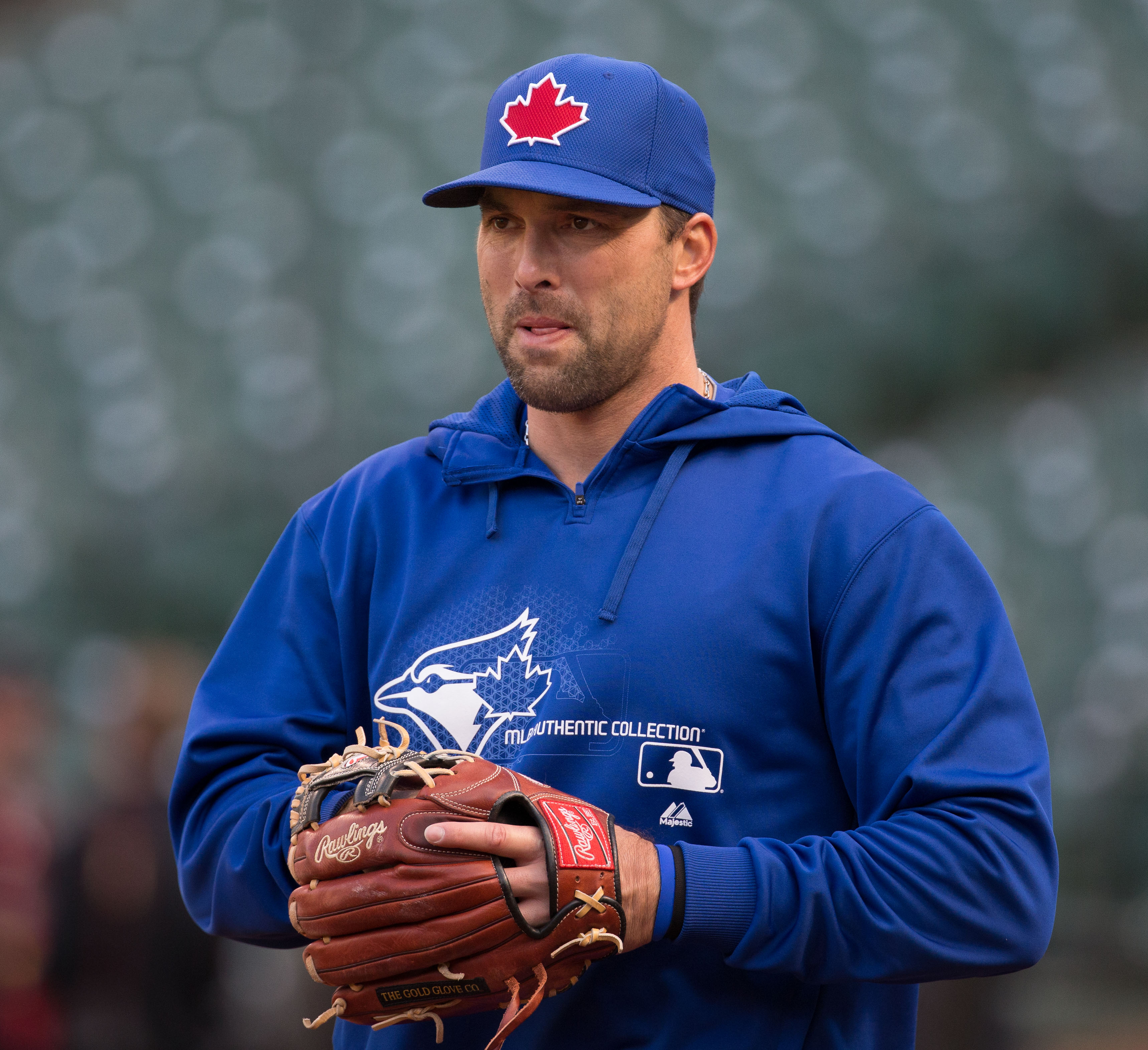
1995 Bourne Braves all-star Mark DeRosa

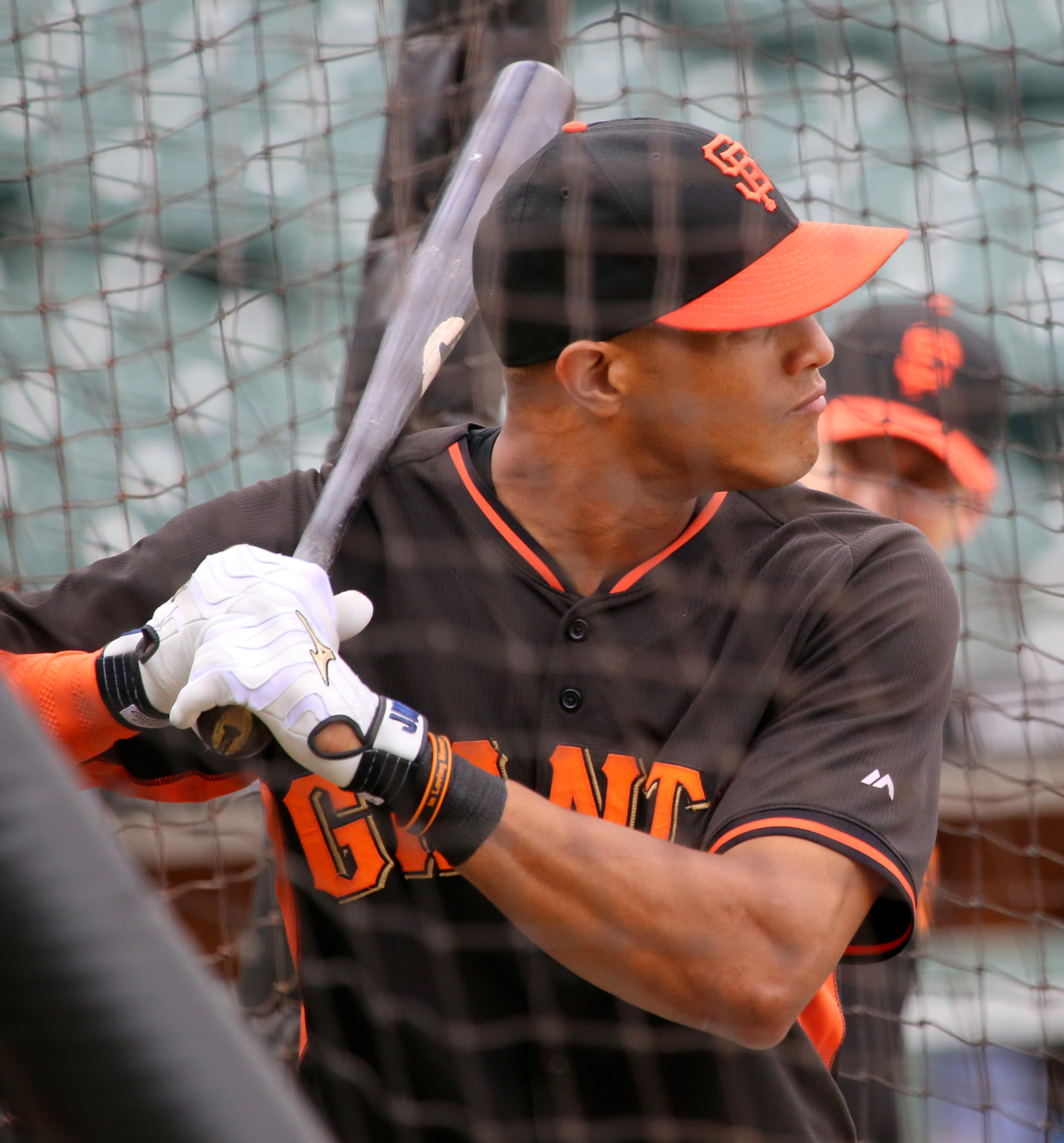
Bourne all-star Justin Maxwell won the league's 10th Player Award in 2003

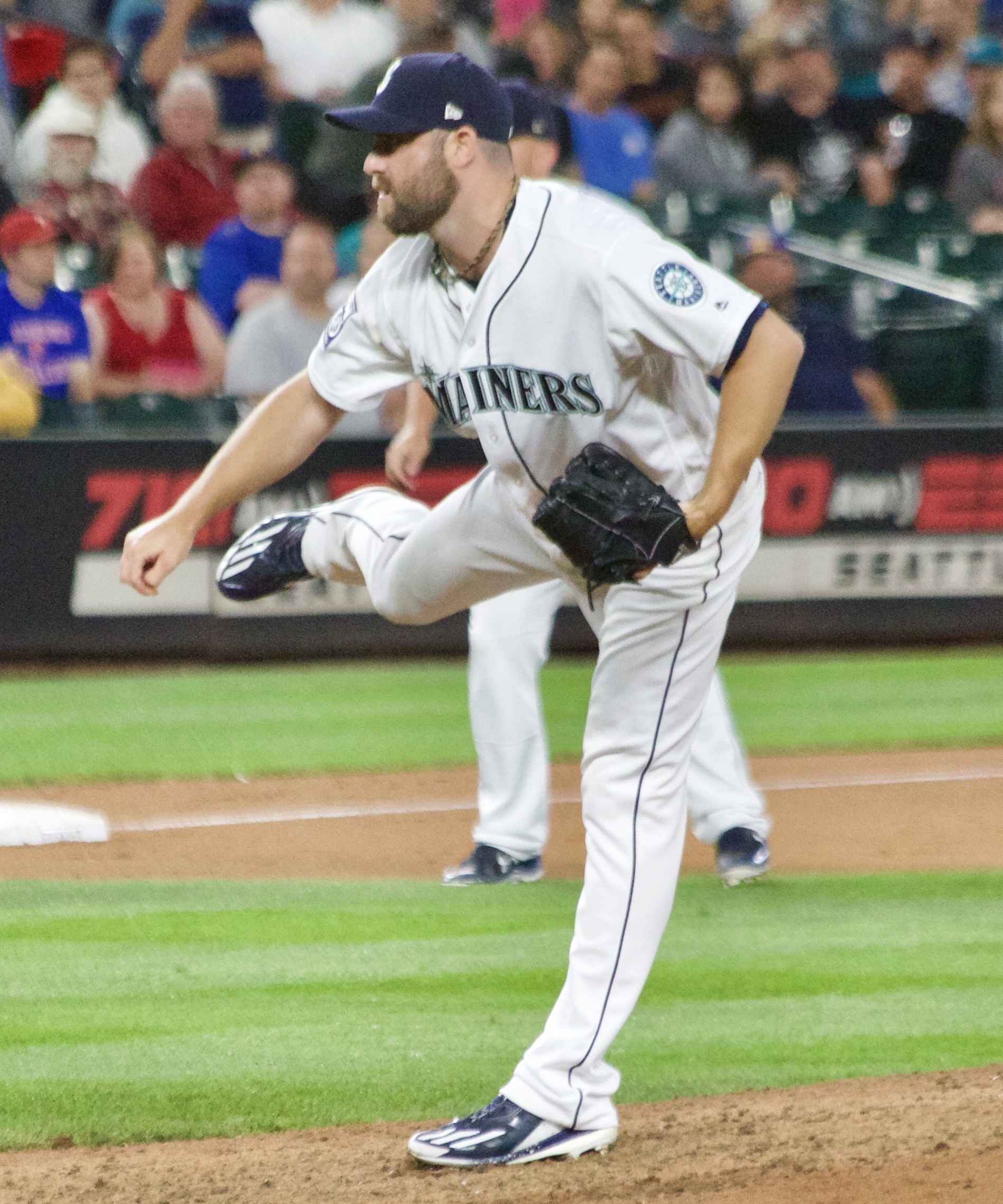
Bourne all-star Tony Zych was CCBL Outstanding Pro Prospect in 2010

Year	Players	Ref
1963	Pete Mottla, Bob Fenton, John Lanza, Bob Driscoll, Rolly Hicks (Sagamore): Jim Prete, Frank DeVincentis, Leon Orvis	
1964	Pete Mottla, Noel Kinski, Lou Lamoriello, Harry Nelson, James Monahan (Sagamore): (None)	
1965	(Sagamore): Pete Mottla, Noel Kinski, Alan Constantino, Robert Ritchie, Daniel Hootstein, James Petteruti, Bob Schaefer, Ron Bugbee, Steve Nelson	
1966	(Sagamore): Phil Trombino, Dan DeMichele	
1967	Paul Fortin	
1968	Jim Prete, Jack Callahan, Fran Combs	
1969	Mike Gabarra, Tommy Smith, Jim Potter, Tom Seybold	
1970	Did not play	
1971	Rich Magner, Augie Garbatini	
1972	Jim Baker	
1973– 1987	Did not play	
1988	Mike Kelly, Mark P. Johnson	
1989	Mike Basse, Warren Sawkiw, Winston Wheeler	
1990	Bill Wissler, Steve Corradi, Brendan Mahoney	
1991	Bill Wissler, Mark Sobolewski, Ron Tucker, Bubba Hardwick, Bobby Higginson	
1992	Kortney Paul, Bill Mueller, Javi Gomez	
1993	Mike Dunnett, Scott Beardsley	
1994	Jeremy Giambi, Mark Kotsay	
1995	Mark DeRosa, Mike Amrhein, Jeremy Jackson, Peter Tucci	
1996	Mark Mortimer, Jason Navarro, Brent Husted	
1997	Mark Mulder, Brandon Inge, Sammy Serrano, Matthew Burch, Chris Heck	
1998	Mike O'Brien, Mike Dzurilla, Matt Griswold, Jeff House, Shane Rhodes, Kelley Gulledge	
1999	Andy Beal, Jeff Carlsen, John Ballon	
2000	Kevin Youkilis, Darren Welch, Josh Brey, Luke DeBold	
2001	Casey Shumaker, Ryan Speier, Mike Dennison, Chad Oliva	
2002	Trey Webb, David Castillo, Matt Brown, Chris Ray	
2003	Justin Maxwell, Kyle Schmid, Eric Beattie, Tim Grant	
2004	Mike Madsen, Austin Easley	
2005	Brad Lincoln, Forrest Cory III, Gib Hobson	
2006	David Cash, Brett Bartles, Andrew Carignan, Tom Farmer, Mitch Moreland	
2007	Kevin Hoef, Ben Guez, Josh Satin, T.J. Hose, Jordan Flasher, Mitch Moreland	
2008	Dusty Coleman, Marc Krauss, Bryce Stowell, Jordan Henry, Nick McCully, Eric Pettis, Kyle Roller	
2009	Kyle Roller, Stephen Harrold, Kevin Munson	
2010	Scott Woodward, Tony Zych, R. J. Alvarez, Grayson Garvin, Dan Bowman	
2011	Colin Moran, Ryan Eades, Patrick Cantwell, Travis Jankowski, Tommy Coyle, Josh Conway, John Farrell	
2012	Colin Moran, John Murphy, Timothy Giel, Mason Robbins	
2013	Max Pentecost, Jaron Long, Tim Caputo, Clint Freeman, Ryan Kellogg, Trace Dempsey, Jeff Schalk	
2014	Mark Laird, Blake Davey, Richie Martin, Travis Bergen, Joey Strain	
2015	Nick Solak, Jacob Robson, Ryan Boldt, Austin Conway, Gavin Pittore, Pete Alonso	
2016	Connor Wong, Justin Yurchak, Jake Mangum, Willy Yahn, Michael Dibrell, Brady Miller, Andrew Wantz, Brendon Little, Danny Reyes	
2017	Grant Williams, Zac Susi, Luis Alvarado, Ryan Feltner	
2018	Spencer Brickhouse, Jared Triolo, Jacob Wallace, Jared DiCesare	
2019	Max Lardner, Harrison Rutkowski, Karl Johnson, Jackson Greer, Jud Fabian, Cody Morissette	
2020	Season cancelled due to coronavirus pandemic	
2021	Dalton Rushing, Christian Knapczyk, Max Anderson, Braylen Wimmer, Michael Sansone, Jake Bennett, Eric Adler, Trystan Vrieling, Austin Parsley	
2022	Matt Shaw, Evan Sleight, Chris Brito, Seth Keener, Ty Cummings, Carson Jones	
2023	Derek Bender, Caden Bodine, Bryce Cunningham, Bryce Eblin, Matthew McShane, Jonathan Vastine	
2024	Joe Ariola, Ethan Conrad, Braden Holcomb, Marek Houston, Chris Stanfield, Justin West	
2025	Logan Hughes, Jon LeGrande, Kade Lewis, Jonathan Stevens, Ryker Waite, Will Whelan, Kuhio Aloy	
2026	Matt Bolton, Andrew Costello, Luke Costello, Ben Dean, Jackson Kircher, Ruston Ridgon, Nick Robert, Blake Schaaf	

Italics - Indicates All-Star Game Home Run Hitting Contest participant

== No-hit games ==
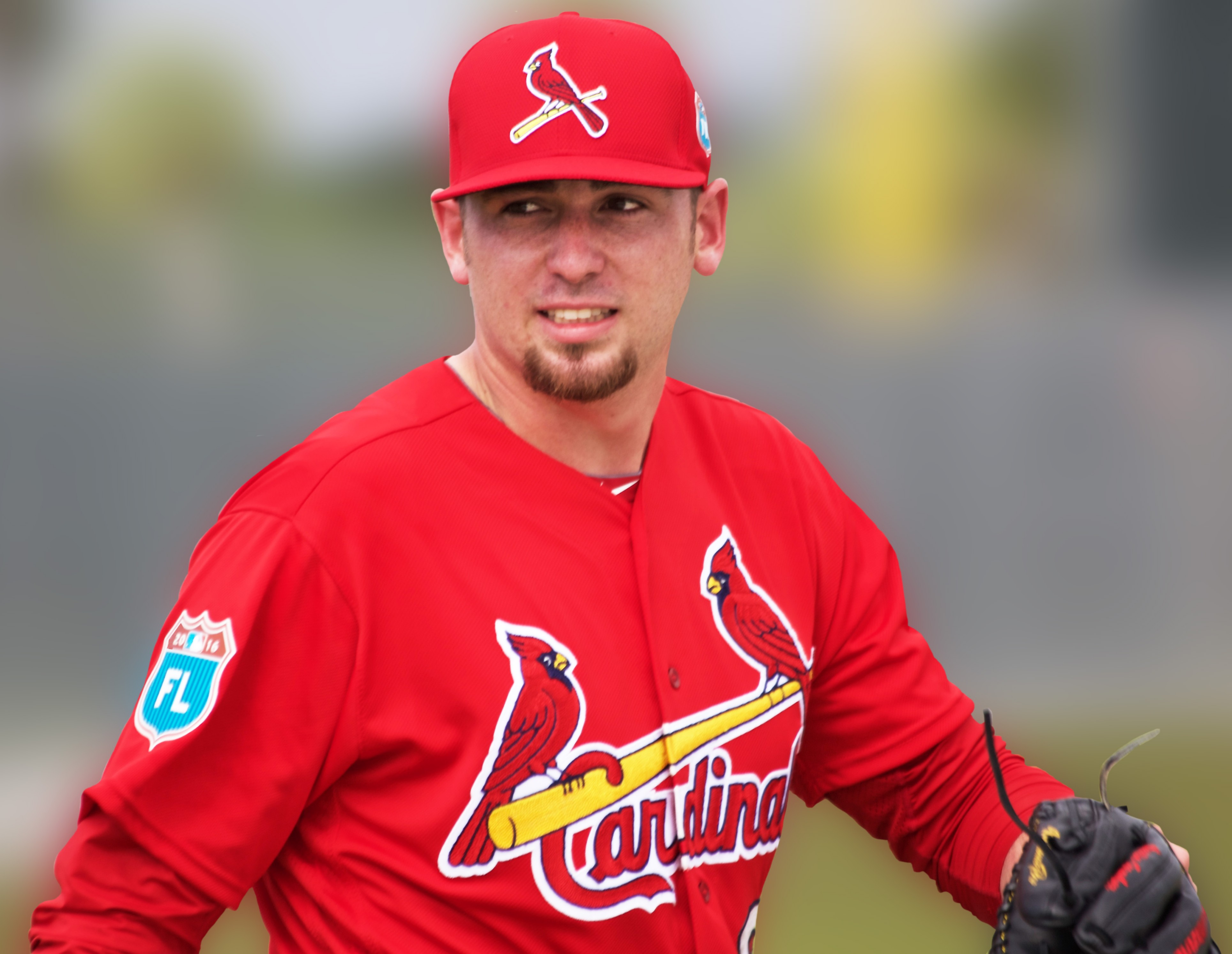
Austin Gomber tossed part of a combined no-hitter for Bourne in 2013.

Year	Pitcher	Opponent	Score	Location	Notes	Ref
1948	Jack Cunningham	Sandwich	4–0			
1952	Jim Patterson (Sagamore)	Cotuit	7–2			
1953	Jim Patterson (Sagamore)	Wareham	5–2			
1953	Jack Sanford (Sagamore)	Falmouth (Falcons)	12–0	Central Park Field		
1953	Jim Patterson (Sagamore)	Mashpee	8–0			
1954	Dick Smith (Sagamore)	Mashpee	3–0			
1955	Larry Cumming (Sagamore)	Wareham	3–0			
1955	Jack Sanford (Sagamore)	Cotuit	6–0			
1959	Russ Nixon (Sagamore)	Maritime	10–0	Keith Field		
1964	Frank Ward (Sagamore)	Wareham	0–2	Clem Spillane Field	Combined; Lost game	
1964	Jack Clough (Sagamore)	Wareham	0–2	Clem Spillane Field	Combined; Lost game	
2008	Nick McCully	Orleans	2–0	Doran Park	Perfect game; 5-inning game	
2012	Jeff Thompson	Harwich	9–0	Doran Park	6-inning game	
2013	Austin Gomber	Cotuit	8–0	Lowell Park	Combined	
2013	Josh Laxer	Cotuit	8–0	Lowell Park	Combined	
2013	Ryan Harris	Cotuit	8–0	Lowell Park	Combined	
2019	Nick Dombkowski	Y-D	6–0	Doran Park	Perfect game; 5-inning game	
2026	Brendon Bennett	Falmouth	4–1	Arnie Allen Diamond	Combined	
2026	Jackson Kircher	Falmouth	4–1	Arnie Allen Diamond	Combined	
2026	Edwin Alicea	Falmouth	4–1	Arnie Allen Diamond	Combined	
2026	Landon White	Falmouth	4–1	Arnie Allen Diamond	Combined	

== Managerial history ==
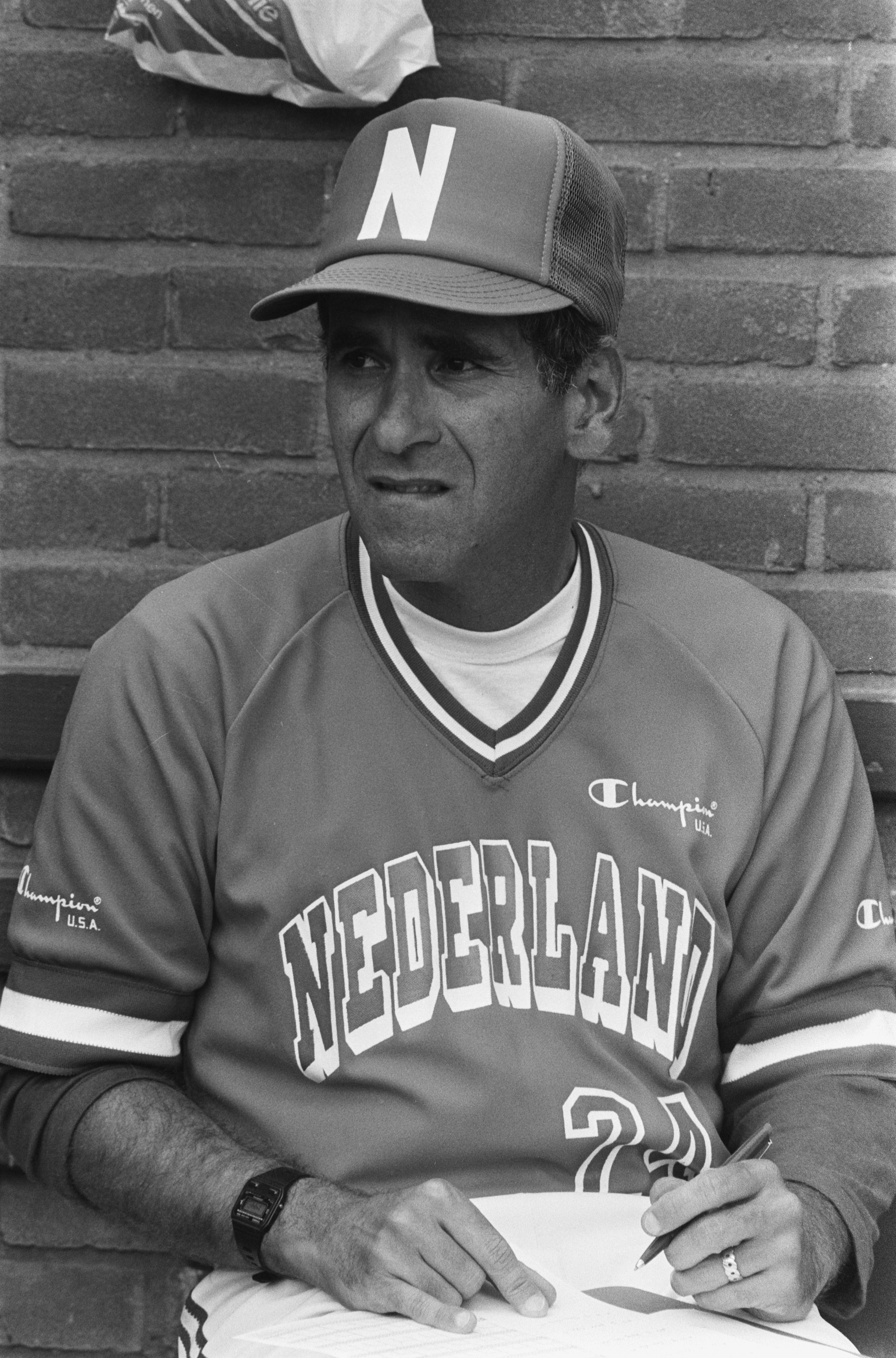
CCBL Hall of Famer Harvey Shapiro led the Braves to their first league title in 2009.

Manager	Seasons	Total Seasons	Championship Seasons
Jim Watkins	1988–1990	3	
Bob Gendron	1991–1993	3	
Nino Giarratano	1994	1	
Bob Stead	1994–1996	3	
Kevin O'Sullivan	1997	1	
Jayson King	1998	1	
Mike Rikard	1999–2000	2	
Spencer Graham	2001	1	
Matt Noone	2002	1	
Harvey Shapiro	2003–2021	18*	2009
Scott Landers	2022–2026	5	2022, 2023, 2025

(*) - Season count excludes 2020 CCBL season cancelled due to coronavirus pandemic.

== See also ==
- Bourne Braves players
