= Keith Car & Manufacturing Company =

American train car manufacturer

Coordinates: 41°46′27.94″N 70°32′3.45″W

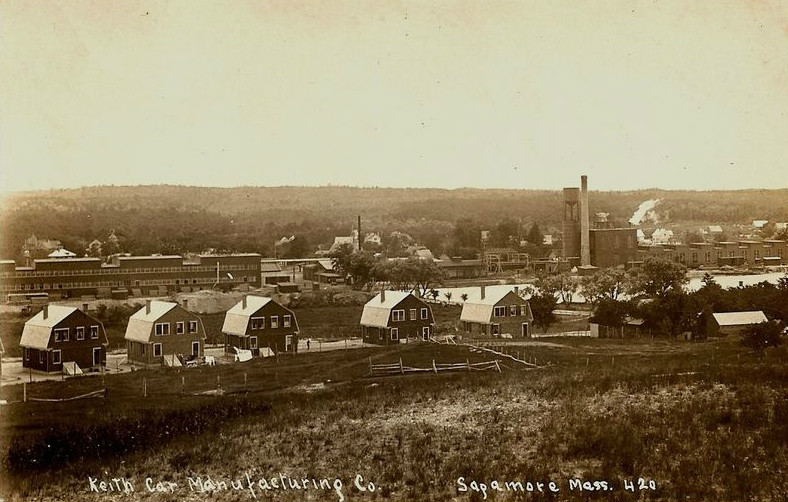
Keith Car & Manufacturing Company, circa 1915

The Keith Car & Manufacturing Company is a former railroad car manufacturing company that was located in the village of Sagamore in Bourne, Massachusetts. Operational between 1846 and 1928, the plant employed up to 1,400 people at a time.

== History ==
The company was founded in 1846 as Keith and Ryder and manufactured carriages, stage coaches, and prairie schooners. The company eventually switched to manufacturing rail cars, in a plant that stretched about a mile long. In the early 1900s, the plant employed hundreds of Italian immigrants, many of whom lived in the area. Following the creation of the Cape Cod Canal, the plant helped to manufacture coffins that would be used to inter recently relocated bodies that were in the path of the canal. In 1912, the company was purchased by the Standard Steel Car Company.

During this time, it was a large repair facility for the New York, New Haven and Hartford Railroad, as well as possibly being the largest employer on Cape Cod, employing up to 1,400 people at a time. The plant also was responsible for the design and patent of the 40-8 boxcar design used by many trains.

During World War I, the plant shipped 40,000 freight cars to Marseille, France, which were built under contract. German prisoners of war then helped to assemble them, placed them onto rail lines, and helped to bring an end to the conflict. In 1928, the company closed after eighty two years in business, and the plant was stripped for materials, after years of being a minor maintenance facility, staffed by a skeleton crew. The plant was demolished in the 1930s, following the second expansion of the Cape Cod Canal.
