= William Venable =

William Venable may refer to:

- William W. Venable (1880–1948), U.S. Representative from Mississippi
- William Henry Venable (1836–1920), American educator
- Will Venable, American baseball player
- Max Venable (William McKinley Venable), American baseball player

== See also ==
- Venable, listing people sharing this surname
