= 2015 Hartford Hawks baseball team =

American college baseball season

2015 Hartford Hawks baseball
- Conference: America East Conference
- Record: 23–31 (10–12 AEC)
- Head coach: Justin Blood (4th season)
- Assistant coaches: Steve Malinowski (4th season); Elliot Glynn (1st season)
- Home stadium: Fiondella Field

2015 America East Conference baseball standings
| | Conf. | | | | | | Overall |
| Team | W | | L | | T | PCT | W | | L | | T | PCT |
|---|---|---|---|---|---|---|---|---|---|---|---|---|
| Stony Brook †‡^{y} ‍‍‍ | 18 | – | 4 | – | 1 | .804 | 35 | – | 16 | – | 1 | .683 |
| UMBC ‍‍‍ | 14 | – | 10 | – | 0 | .583 | 34 | – | 20 | – | 0 | .630 |
| Maine ‍‍‍ | 10 | – | 10 | – | 0 | .500 | 24 | – | 28 | – | 0 | .462 |
| UMass Lowell * ‍‍‍ | 10 | – | 10 | – | 0 | .500 | 17 | – | 26 | – | 0 | .395 |
| Hartford ‍‍‍ | 10 | – | 12 | – | 0 | .455 | 23 | – | 31 | – | 0 | .426 |
| Albany ‍‍‍ | 7 | – | 13 | – | 0 | .350 | 14 | – | 28 | – | 0 | .333 |
| Binghamton ‍‍‍ | 6 | – | 16 | – | 1 | .283 | 17 | – | 24 | – | 2 | .419 |
† – Conference champion ‡ – Tournament champion y – Invited to the NCAA tournament Ineligible for league and NCAA tournaments due to transition from Division II; As of June 30, 2015; Rankings from Collegiate Baseball

The 2015 Hartford Hawks baseball team represented the University of Hartford during the 2015 NCAA Division I baseball season. The Hawks played their home games at Fiondella Field as a member of the America East Conference. They were led by head coach Justin Blood, in his 4th season at Hartford.

== Previous season ==
In 2014, the Hawks finished the season 2nd in the America East with a record of 31–23, 16–7 in conference play. They qualified for the 2014 America East Conference baseball tournament and were eliminated in the semifinals. They failed to qualify for the 2014 NCAA Division I baseball tournament.

== Personnel ==
=== Roster ===
2015 Hartford Hawks roster
| Pitchers: 1 - Austin Barnes - Senior; 9 - John McGinty - (redshirt) Sophomore; 11 - Jake Regula - Freshman; 12 - Brian Stepniak - Sophomore; 17 - Jeremy Charles - Junior; 18 - Sam McKay - Junior; 22 - Ben Brown - Freshman; 23 - Brian Murphy - Junior; 24 - David Drouin - Sophomore; 26 - Kevin Wiltse - Freshman; 28 - Jacob Mellin - Junior; 29 - Anthony Rovasio - Freshman; 30 - Justin Robarge - Junior; 32 - Tyler Mitchell - Freshman; 33 - Kevin Tise - Freshman; 34 - Collin Ferguson - Freshman; 35 - Kyle Gauthier - Junior | Catchers: 16 - Joe Roberti - Junior; 21 - Erik Ostberg - Freshman; 25 - Billy Walker - Junior; Infielders: 2 - Aaron Wilson - Junior; 3 - TJ Ward - Freshman; 4 - Cam Belliveau - Freshman; 5 - Joe Shashaty - Freshman; 6 - Dalton Ruch - Sophomore; 7 - Trey Stover - Senior; 8 - Ben Bengston - Freshman; 19 - David MacKinnon - Sophomore; 31 - Justin Ganca - Freshman; 36 - Brady Sheetz - Senior | Outfielders: 10 - Chris DelDebbio - Junior; 13 - John LaRossa - Sophomore; 14 - Nick Campana - Freshman; 15 - Ryan Lukach - (redshirt) Senior; 20 - Sebastian DiMauro - Freshman |

=== Coaching staff ===
| Name | Position | Seasons at Hartford | Alma mater |
|---|---|---|---|
| Justin Blood | Head coach | 4 | Franklin Pierce University (2001) |
| Steve Malinowski | Assistant coach | 3 | University of Connecticut (2007) |
| Elliot Glynn | Assistant coach | 1 | University of Connecticut (2011) |

== Schedule ==
Legend
| | Hartford win |
| | Hartford loss |
| | Postponement |
| **Bold** | Hartford team member |

2015 Hartford Hawks Game Log
Regular season (22–29)

February (3–3)
| Date | Opponent | Rank | Site/stadium | Score | Win | Loss | Save | Attendance | Overall record | AEC Record |
|---|---|---|---|---|---|---|---|---|---|---|
| February 20 | at Duke | | Jack Coombs Field • Durham, NC | Postponed Rescheduled for February 21 | | | | | | |
| February 21 | vs. Iona | | USA Baseball National Training Complex • Cary, NC | **W** 12–1 | **Gauthier** (1–0) | Maier (0–1) | | 127 | 1–0 | – |
| February 21 | at Duke | | Jack Coombs Field • Durham, NC | **L** 1–5 | Istler (1–0) | **Murphy** (0–1) | Hendrix (1) | 228 | 1–1 | – |
| February 22 | vs. Delaware State | | USA Baseball National Training Complex • Cary, NC | **W** 6–0 | **McKay** (1–0) | Dill (0–1) | | 106 | 2–1 | – |
| February 27 | vs. Seton Hall | | Griffith Field • Myrtle Beach, SC | Postponed Rescheduled for February 28 | | | | | | |
| February 27 | vs. Virginia | | Ebbets Field • Myrtle Beach, SC | **L** 1–5 | Kirby (3–0) | **Gauthier** (1–1) | Bettinger (1) | 255 | 2–2 | – |
| February 28 | vs. Cornell | | Griffith Field • Myrtle Beach, SC | **L** 3–4 | Busto (1–0) | **Charles** (0–1) | | 85 | 2–3 | – |
| February 28 | vs. Seton Hall | | Griffith Field • Myrtle Beach, SC | **W** 3–1 | **McKay** (2–0) | Leon (0–1) | **McGinty (1)** | 95 | 3–3 | – |

March (4–11)
| Date | Opponent | Rank | Site/stadium | Score | Win | Loss | Save | Attendance | Overall record | AEC Record |
|---|---|---|---|---|---|---|---|---|---|---|
| March 5 | at BYU | | Larry H. Miller Field • Provo, UT | **L** 0–6 | Mahoney (1–1) | **Gauthier** (1–2) | | 803 | 3–4 | – |
| March 6 | at BYU | | Larry H. Miller Field • Provo, UT | **L** 6–8 | Gates (1–0) | **Robarge** (0–1) | Rucker (1) | 825 | 3–5 | – |
| March 6 | at BYU | | Larry H. Miller Field • Provo, UT | **L** 4–20^{7} | Kinser (1–1) | **Mellin** (0–1) | | 825 | 3–6 | – |
| March 7 | at BYU | | Larry H. Miller Field • Provo, UT | **L** 7–11 | Cenatiempo (1–1) | **McKay** (2–1) | | 817 | 3–7 | – |
| March 11 | at Central Connecticut; Rivalry | | Balf–Savin Field • New Britain, CT | **W** 4–3 | **Tise** (1–0) | Frawley (0–2) | **McGinty** (2) | 217 | 4–7 | – |
| March 15 | at UMBC | | The Baseball Factory Field at UMBC • Catonsville, MD | **L** 1–6 | Vanderplas (1–2) | **Gauthier** (1–3) | | 113 | 4–8 | 0–1 |
| March 15 | at UMBC | | The Baseball Factory Field at UMBC • Catonsville, MD | **W** 5–2^{7} | **McKay** (3–1) | Little (0–1) | | 113 | 5–8 | 1–1 |
| March 16 | at UMBC | | The Baseball Factory Field at UMBC • Catonsville, MD | **W** 6–4 | **Charles** (1–1) | Vlasic (0–1) | **McGinty** (3) | 126 | 6–8 | 2–1 |
| March 17 | at Yale | | Yale Field • West Haven, CT | **L** 8–23 | Lanham (2–1) | **Rovasio** (0–1) | | 248 | 6–9 | – |
| March 21 | Maine | | Fiondella Field • West Hartford, CT | **W** 10–5 | **Gauthier** (2–3) | Heath (3–2) | | 168 | 7–9 | 3–1 |
| March 24 | Marist | | Fiondella Field • West Hartford, CT | **L** 1–8 | Dearden (1–1) | **Murphy** (0–2) | | 127 | 7–10 | – |
| March 25 | at Fairfield | | Alumni Baseball Diamond • Fairfield, CT | **L** 3–7 | Gallagher (1–0) | **McGinty** (0–1) | | 189 | 7–11 | – |
| March 29 | at Bryant | | Conaty Park • Smithfield, RI | **L** 0–3 | Wilcox (1–1) | **Gauthier** (2–4) | Lacosse (1) | 217 | 7–12 | – |
| March 29 | at Bryant | | Conaty Park • Smithfield, RI | **L** 2–3 | Karinchak (2–3) | **McKay** (3–2) | Lessard (1) | 217 | 7–13 | – |
| March 31 | Holy Cross | | Fiondella Field • West Hartford, CT | **L** 1–3 | Manning (1–2) | **Stepniak** (0–1) | Gustin (1) | 183 | 7–14 | – |

April (8–11)
| Date | Opponent | Rank | Site/stadium | Score | Win | Loss | Save | Attendance | Overall record | AEC Record |
|---|---|---|---|---|---|---|---|---|---|---|
| March 17 | at Yale | | Yale Field • West Haven, CT | **W** 5–2^{10} | **Mellin** (1–1) | Kukowski (2–1) | | 72 | 8–14 | – |
| April 5 | at Albany | | Varsity Field • Albany, NY | **W** 4–3^{10} | **Charles** (2–1) | Moore (1–1) | | 203 | 9–14 | 4–1 |
| April 5 | at Albany | | Varsity Field • Albany, NY | **L** 0–5^{7} | Woods (2–2) | **McKay** (3–3) | | 194 | 9–15 | 4–2 |
| April 6 | at Albany | | Varsity Field • Albany, NY | **L** 1–2^{10} | Romero (2–0) | **McGinty** (0–2) | | 198 | 9–16 | 4–3 |
| April 7 | at Sacred Heart | | The Ballpark at Harbor Yard • Bridgeport, CT | **W** 10–0 | **Regula** (1–0) | Landers (1–3) | | 23 | 10–16 | – |
| April 8 | at Connecticut | | J. O. Christian Field • Storrs, CT | **W** 6–1 | **Mellin** (2–1) | Montgomerie (1–1) | | 44 | 11–16 | – |
| April 11 | Binghamton | | Fiondella Field • West Hartford, CT | **W** 7–6^{10} | **Charles** (3–1) | Urbanski (1–1) | | 217 | 12–16 | 5–3 |
| April 11 | Binghamton | | Fiondella Field • West Hartford, CT | **L** 4–8^{7} | Bunal (3–3) | **McKay** (3–4) | Liegi (1) | 217 | 12–17 | 5–4 |
| April 12 | Binghamton | | Fiondella Field • West Hartford, CT | **L** 3–9 | Hardy (2–2) | **Murphy** (0–3) | | 313 | 12–18 | 5–5 |
| April 14 | Quinnipiac | | Fiondella Field • West Hartford, CT | **L** 5–8 | Scaglione (2–4) | **Tise** (1–1) | | 263 | 12–19 | – |
| April 15 | at UMass | | Earl Lorden Field • Amherst, MA | **L** 3–4 | Venditti (2–0) | **Brown** (0–1) | Mackintosh (2) | 175 | 12–20 | – |
| April 18 | at Maine | | Mahaney Diamond • Orono, ME | **L** 3–4 | Butler (3–3) | **Gauthier** (2–5) | | 574 | 12–21 | 5–6 |
| April 18 | at Maine | | Mahaney Diamond • Orono, ME | **L** 3–4^{7} | Courtney (2–4) | **McKay** (3–5) | Fullmer (1) | 574 | 12–22 | 5–7 |
| April 19 | at Maine | | Mahaney Diamond • Orono, ME | **W** 6–3^{12} | **Barnes** (1–0) | Butler (3–4) | | 731 | 13–22 | 6–7 |
| April 22 | Rhode Island | | Fiondella Field • West Hartford, CT | **W** 7–6 | **Mellin** (3–1) | Grillo (0–1) | **Charles** (1) | 132 | 14–22 | – |
| April 25 | UMass Lowell | | Fiondella Field • West Hartford, CT | **L** 0–3 | Ryan (1–1) | **Gauthier** (2–6) | | 187 | 14–23 | 6–8 |
| April 25 | UMass Lowell | | Fiondella Field • West Hartford, CT | **L** 4–5 | Lavoie (2–3) | **Charles** (3–2) | | 256 | 14–24 | 6–9 |
| April 26 | UMass Lowell | | Fiondella Field • West Hartford, CT | **L** 1–3 | DeGroot (3–2) | **Murphy** (0–4) | | 537 | 14–25 | 6–10 |
| April 28 | at Quinnipiac | | Quinnipiac Baseball Field • Hamden, CT | **W** 7–5 | **Stepniak** (1–1) | Scaglione (2–5) | **Barnes** (1) | 153 | 15–25 | – |

May (7–4)
| Date | Opponent | Rank | Site/stadium | Score | Win | Loss | Save | Attendance | Overall record | AEC Record |
|---|---|---|---|---|---|---|---|---|---|---|
| May 2 | at Stony Brook | | Joe Nathan Field • Stony Brook, NY | **W** 10–9 | **Gauthier** (3–6) | Honahan (6–3) | **Charles** (2) | 332 | 16–25 | 7–10 |
| May 2 | at Stony Brook | | Joe Nathan Field • Stony Brook, NY | **L** 3–4^{7} | Stone (2–0) | **McKay** (3–6) | | 332 | 16–26 | 7–11 |
| May 3 | at Stony Brook | | Joe Nathan Field • Stony Brook, NY | **W** 12–10 | **Barnes** (2–0) | Rodliff (1–1) | **Regula** (1) | 287 | 17–26 | 8–11 |
| May 5 | Northeastern | | Fiondella Field • West Hartford, CT | **W** 9–6 | **Stepniak** (2–1) | Christian (0–4) | **Barnes** (2) | 659 | 18–26 | – |
| May 9 | at Boston College | | Eddie Pellagrini Diamond • Chestnut Hill, MA | **L** 1–4 | Gorman (5–4) | **Barnes** (2–1) | | 1,012 | 18–27 | – |
| May 10 | at Boston College | | Eddie Pellagrini Diamond • Chestnut Hill, MA | **W** 5–2 | **Charles** (5–2) | Nicklas (1–1) | **Mellin** (1) | 321 | 19–27 | – |
| May 12 | Central Connecticut; Rivalry | | Fiondella Field • West Hartford, CT | **L** 5–8 | Younger (1–0) | **Robarge** (0–2) | Salnitis (1) | 436 | 19–28 | – |
| May 13 | Bryant | | Conaty Park • Smithfield, RI | **W** 9–0 | **Ferguson** (1–0) | Snyder (2–4) | | 260 | 20–28 | – |
| May 15 | UMBC | | Fiondella Field • West Hartford, CT | **W** 1–0 | **Gauthier** (4–6) | Chanin (5–2) | **Charles** (3) | 206 | 21–28 | 9–11 |
| May 15 | UMBC | | Fiondella Field • West Hartford, CT | **L** 0–4^{7} | Wozniak (3–1) | **McKay** (3–7) | | 206 | 21–29 | 9–12 |
| May 16 | UMBC | | Fiondella Field • West Hartford, CT | **W** 7–3 | **Murphy** (1–4) | Ladner (2–1) | | 278 | 22–29 | 10–12 |

Post-Season (1–2)

America East Tournament (1–2)
| Date | Opponent | Rank | Site/stadium | Score | Win | Loss | Save | Attendance | Overall record | AECT Record |
|---|---|---|---|---|---|---|---|---|---|---|
| May 21 | vs. (1) Stony Brook | (4) | Edward A. LeLacheur Park • Lowell, MA | **L** 0–2 | Zamora (7–2) | **Gauthier** (4–7) | Stone (5) | | 22–30 | 0–1 |
| May 22 | vs. (3) Maine | (4) | Edward A. LeLacheur Park • Lowell, MA | **W** 11–2 | **McKay** (4–7) | Heath (6–4) | | | 23–30 | 1–1 |
| May 23 | vs. (2) UMBC | (4) | Edward A. LeLacheur Park • Lowell, MA | **L** 2–10 | Callahan (4–0) | **Murphy** (1–5) | | | 23–31 | 1–2 |

All rankings from Collegiate Baseball.
