= Venable =

Venable is a surname shared by several notable people:

- Venable Brothers, rock quarry business of Samuel and William Venable that included Stone Mountain, Georgia.
- Abraham B. Venable (1758–1811), American state and national politician
- Abraham Watkins Venable (1799–1876), American state and national politician
- Charles L. Venable (born 1960), former CEO of the Indianapolis Museum of Art in Indianapolis, Indiana
- Charles S. Venable (1827–1900), American mathematician, astronomer, academic, Confederate Civil War officer
- David Venable (television personality) (born 1964), American TV personality and QVC host
- Edward Carrington Venable (1853–1908), American national politician
- Evelyn Venable (1913–1993), American actress
- Francis Preston Venable (1856–1934), American chemist and academic
- James Venable (disambiguation), multiple people
- Max Venable (born 1957), American professional baseball player
- Noe Venable (born 1976), American singer-songwriter
- Richard Venable (born 1944), American state politician
- Robert Venable (born 1981), American music recording engineer and producer
- Will Venable (born 1982), American baseball player
- William Henry Venable (1836–1920), American author and educator
- William W. Venable (1880–1948), American lawyer and national politician

== Other ==
- Venable, Missouri, a community in the United States
- Venable, Ohio, a ghost town
- Venable LLP, a U.S. law firm
- Venable, a hotel that became the Hamilton Hotel (Portland, Oregon)
- Venable Mound, an archaeological site in Louisiana, USA

== See also ==
- Venables, surname
