= Venables-Vernon-Harcourt =

Venables-Vernon-Harcourt is a surname:

- Edward Venables-Vernon-Harcourt (1757–1847), English clergyman
- Francis Venables-Vernon-Harcourt (1801–1880), British politician
- Robert Venables Vernon Harcourt (1878–1962), British diplomat, playwright

== See also ==
- Harcourt-Vernon
- Vernon-Harcourt
- Venables-Vernon
- Harcourt (surname)
- Vernon family
- Venables
