= UMBC Retrievers =

Athletic program of the University of Maryland, Baltimore County

- University: University of Maryland, Baltimore County
- Nickname: Retrievers; Dawgs
- NCAA: Division I
- Conference: America East
- Athletic director: Tiffany Tucker
- Location: Catonsville, Maryland
- Varsity teams: 17
- Basketball arena: Chesapeake Employers Insurance Arena
- Baseball stadium: The Baseball Factory Field at UMBC
- Soccer stadium: Retriever Soccer Park
- Colors: Black and gold
- Mascot: True Grit
- Fight song: UMBC Riser
- Website: umbcretrievers.com

The UMBC Retrievers are the athletic teams that represent the University of Maryland, Baltimore County, located in Catonsville, Maryland, in intercollegiate athletics as a member of the Division I level of the National Collegiate Athletic Association (NCAA), primarily competing in the America East Conference since the 2003–04 academic year. The Retrievers previously competed in the Northeast Conference (NEC) from 1998–99 to 2002–03, and in the Big South Conference from 1992–93 to 1997–98, while they also competed in the Mason–Dixon Conference at the NCAA Division II ranks: the first variation of it from 1972–73 to 1977–78, and the second variation from 1983–84 to 1987–88.

On March 16, 2018, the Retrievers men's basketball team defeated the #1 ranked Virginia Cavaliers in the NCAA men's basketball tournament. This was the first time a 16-seed had ever defeated a 1-seed in the tournament out of 135 previous match-ups.

== Sports sponsored ==
UMBC competes in 17 intercollegiate varsity sports: Men's sports include baseball, basketball, cross country, lacrosse, soccer, swimming & diving and track & field (indoor and outdoor); women's sports include basketball, cross country, lacrosse, soccer, softball, swimming & diving, track & field (indoor and outdoor) and volleyball.

Men's sports	Women's sports
Baseball	Softball
Basketball	Basketball
Cross country	Cross country
Lacrosse	Lacrosse
Soccer	Soccer
Swimming and diving	Swimming and diving
Track and field^{1}	Track and field^{1}
	Volleyball
^{1} – includes both indoor and outdoor

=== Baseball ===
The UMBC Retrievers baseball team competes at the Division I level of the NCAA. The team is led by Bob Mumma, and plays its home games at Alumni Field on campus in Baltimore. The Retrievers are members of the America East Conference.

=== Basketball ===
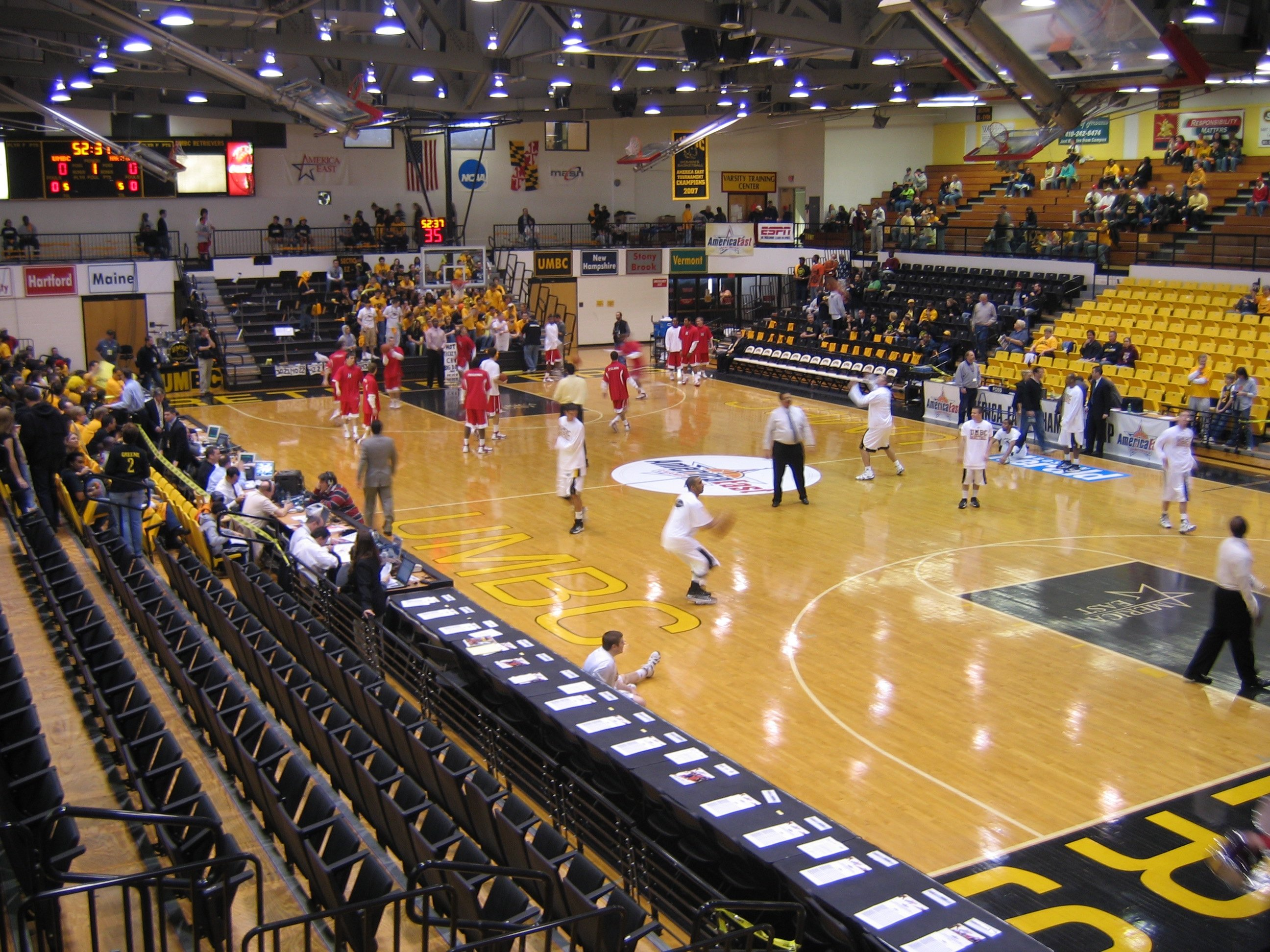
The Retriever Activities Center prior to the 2008 America East Conference Championship Game

The Retrievers won their first regular-season American East men's basketball title in 2007–08, and also qualified for their first NCAA Division I men's basketball tournament. They had previously competed in the Division II men's basketball tournament.

In 2018, they became the first 16-seeded team in the history of the NCAA Men's Basketball tournament to defeat a 1-seeded team by beating the Virginia Cavaliers 74–54.

Retrievers basketball games are broadcast by Paul Mittermeier and Gary Stein as well as Troy Greene and Dan Levin.

=== Soccer ===
The UMBC Retrievers men's soccer team won the America East Conference in 2010, receiving an automatic bid to the NCAA Division I Men's Soccer Tournament. The Retrievers won their first-round game against Princeton but lost in the second round in a shootout to a ranked William & Mary team.

The 2010 team's star striker, Levi Houapeu, was drafted as the fifth pick in the third round of the 2011 MLS SuperDraft by the Philadelphia Union. He is the first UMBC player to be drafted into MLS.

The men also won the conference in 2012, going to the NCAA Tournament once again. They won their first-round game against Old Dominion, but lost in penalty kicks in the second round to defending champion North Carolina.

In 2013, the Retrievers led the country in overall record (16–1–3) and became the first team since 1997 to repeat as America East Conference champions. They were ranked #16 and earned a first round bye, as well as hosting UMBC's first-ever NCAA Tournament match in any sport. The Retrievers would fall in a penalty shootout for the third time in four years in the second round of the tournament, this time to UConn.

In 2014, the Retrievers won their third straight America East Conference championship and advanced the furthest of any UMBC NCAA Division I team by beating the #12-ranked Creighton 4–3 on PKs, as the Retrievers reached the NCAA Men's Soccer Tournament semifinals. UMBC is the first team in tournament history to win four consecutive road games and to post shutouts in four consecutive games (which happened behind goalkeeper Billy Heavner and the back four of Jordan Becker, Oumar Ballo, Marquez Fernandez, and Spencer Williams against Wake Forest, #4-ranked Maryland, #13-ranked Louisville and #12-ranked Creighton) to reach the College Cup.

The Retriever women's soccer team won their first American East Conference title and made their first NCAA tournament appearance in 2013, where they lost to #1-ranked Virginia Tech 2–0 in the first round. This was notable considering the team had a cumulative record of 3-39-9 in their previous three years.

=== Tennis ===
America East Conference logo in UMBC's colors

The most recent change to the roster of supported sports was the dropping of the men's and women's tennis teams after the 2015–16 season. At the time of the tennis program's demise, the men competed in the Missouri Valley Conference and the women in the America East.

=== Cheerleading ===
The UMBC Retrievers dance team, cheerleading squad, mascot, and the "Down and Dirty Dawg" Pep Band also are supported through UMBC Athletics.

== Non-varsity programs ==
Sport	Figure	Venue	Achievements
Wrestling (men)	Luke Broadwater	RAC Arena	NCWA National Championship - 10th place team: 2010, 9th place team: 2011, 8th place team: 2018. Individual National Champions: Alex Broadwater (149 lbs) 2008. Individual All Americans: Alex Broadwater 2007, 2008, 2009; Michael Hornzell (149 lbs) 2007; Justin Bowser (141 lbs) 2009; Angelo Ambridge (125 lbs) 2010; Zach Coe (165 lbs) 2010; Daniel Carr (149 lbs) 2011, 2012, 2013; Kekura Musa 2011; Brian Samuels (141 lbs) 2012; Alec Pence (197 lbs) 2012; Azamat Akhmedov (157 lbs) 2018; Martin Mitchell (149 lbs) 2018.
Ice hockey (men)	Zachary Calvitt	The Gardens Ice House	ACHA National Tournament 2010, 2011, 2012, 2014. ACHA National Semifinalist 2010, 2014. Mid-Atlantic Collegiate Hockey Champions 2009, 2010, 2011, 2014. Individual All-Americans: Nik Jost 2012, 2013. NCAA Tournament appearances 2009, 2010, 2019.
Volleyball (men)		RAC Arena	2014 NCVF quarterfinalist
Rugby (men)	Hannibal	Walker Field	2015 3rd in region

== Notable alumni ==
- Zach Clark – Major League Baseball pitcher
- Wayne Franklin – former Major League Baseball pitcher
- Dan Marohl – National Lacrosse League forward for the Minnesota Swarm
- Steve Marohl – former National Lacrosse League forward for the Baltimore Thunder and Pittsburgh Crossefire; Major League Lacrosse attack for the Baltimore Bayhawks
- Brendan Mundorf – National Lacrosse League forward for the New York Titans; Major League Lacrosse attack for the Denver Outlaws
- Jeff Ratcliffe – National Lacrosse League forward for the New York Titans
- Drew Westervelt – National Lacrosse League forward for the Philadelphia Wings; Major League Lacrosse attack for the Denver Outlaws
- Jay Witasick – Major League Baseball pitcher

== Mascot ==
The retriever mascot is a Chesapeake Bay Retriever, the state dog of Maryland. A statue of a retriever known as True Grit stands in front of the Retriever Activities Center (RAC). UMBC's costumed mascot has been known both as True Grit and Fever. UMBC also once had a live mascot named Campus Sam. Today, there is a live mascot named Gritty. In 2007, True revealed he had a sister, Trudy Grit, at the volleyball pep rally. She was used as a mascot as well.

To commemorate the 40th anniversary of UMBC in 2006, the university held the "March of the Retrievers," a procession of 40 Chesapeake Bay Retrievers from the True Grit statue to the University Commons and then on to the UMBC Soccer Stadium, site of the Homecoming soccer match.

=== True Grit ===
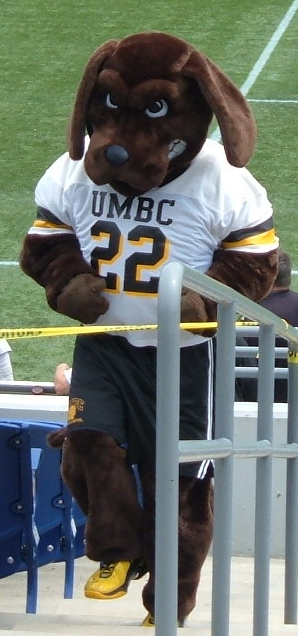
True Grit at a lacrosse match

True Grit is the name of the mascot at UMBC. True Grit appears in two forms: Both as a statue in front of the Retriever Activities Center of a Chesapeake Bay Retriever and as a costumed mascot, an anthropomorphized Chesapeake Bay Retriever. The latter can typically be seen in attire of whatever sport he is currently attending; this is most often basketball or lacrosse.

=== History ===
The Chesapeake Bay Retriever is the state dog of Maryland and has been the mascot of UMBC since weeks after its founding in 1966. The costumed mascot was alternately known as "Fever the Retriever" in the late 1990s. The university also once had a live mascot, upon whom the True Grit statue is based, named Campus Sam. At the beginning of the 2008 fall semester, a Chesapeake Bay Retriever puppy was chosen as a new mascot. He attends many athletic events and an online poll was held on the Retriever Activities Center website to choose his name, which was ultimately decided as "Gritty".

The costumed mascot has been fairly consistent throughout the years, with one notable exception. At convocation at the beginning of the 2002–2003 academic year, a new mascot costume was unveiled that was quite different from the previous costume. This mascot was active throughout the rest of the school year, but following that year a familiar-looking mascot returned—the new costume was similar to the first edition, with a slightly darker brown coat.

== "UMBC Riser" ==
"UMBC Riser" is the official fight song of the UMBC Retrievers, and was written by Dr. George LaNoue, a professor of policy sciences.

== Alma mater ==
UMBC's alma mater debuted in 2006 in conjunction with the 40th anniversary festivities. The tune is "American Hymn" by Matthias Keller, and the lyrics and arrangement are by Jari Villanueva, former director of UMBC's pep band.

== Facilities ==
UMBC built a new $85 million arena and events center, and opened it as the Chesapeake Employers Insurance Arena on February 3, 2018. The new arena hosts Retriever basketball and volleyball games, as well as convocations, speaker events, and other community events.
