= Bob Mumma =

American college baseball coach (born 1971)

Biographical details
- Born: March 16, 1971 (age 55); Havre de Grace, Maryland

Playing career
- 1990–1992: UMBC
- 1992–1994: South Bend White Sox
- 1992: Utica Blue Sox
- 1992: Gulf Coast League White Sox
- 1993–1994: Hickory Crawdads
- Position: C

Coaching career (HC unless noted)
- 1997–2011: UMBC (Asst.)
- 2012–2019: UMBC

Head coaching record
- Overall: 174–228
- Tournaments: America East: 5–6; NCAA: 0–2

Accomplishments and honors

Championships
- America East tournament (2017)

Awards
- America East Coach of the Year (2015)

Robert S. Mumma (born March 16, 1971) is an American college baseball coach. He served as head coach of the UMBC Retrievers baseball team from 2012 season to 2019.

== Playing career ==
Mumma played three seasons at UMBC as a catcher, earning All-Conference honors in his final season and setting several Retrievers offensive records. He remains the all-time home run leader at UMBC, and is tied for second in RBI all time. He was drafted in the 13th round of the 1992 MLB draft. He played three seasons in the Chicago White Sox organization, reaching Class A. Mumma completed his degree in Economics in 1993.

== Coaching career ==
After serving as an academic advisor in the UMBC athletic department and as a volunteer assistant coach, Mumma became a full-time assistant for the 2006 season. He became the fourth UMBC head coach after John Jancuska's retirement. on May 1, 2019, Mumma resigned from his position as head coach at UMBC.

== Head coaching record ==
This table depicts Mumma's record as a head coach.

Record table
Season	Team	Overall	Conference	Standing	Postseason
UMBC Retrievers (America East Conference) (2012–2019)
2012	UMBC	10–42	2–22	6th (6)	
2013	UMBC	18–30	9–21	6th (6)	
2014	UMBC	17–29	7–17	t-6th (7)	
2015	UMBC	34–20	14–10	2nd (7)	America East tournament
2016	UMBC	28–23	13–10	4th (7)	America East tournament
2017	UMBC	23–25	11–9	2nd (7)	NCAA Regional
2018	UMBC	22–29	12–11	3rd (7)	America East tournament
2019	UMBC	20–20	6–12		
UMBC:		172–218	74–112		
Total:		172–218			
National champion Postseason invitational champion Conference regular season champion Conference regular season and conference tournament champion Division regular season champion Division regular season and conference tournament champion Conference tournament champion
