= 2018 America East Conference baseball tournament =

American college baseball tournament

- Teams: 6
- Format: Double-elimination
- Finals site: Mahaney Diamond; Orono, ME
- Champions: Hartford Hawks (1st title)
- Winning coach: Justin Blood (1st title)
- MVP: Drew DeMartino (Hartford)
- Television: ESPN+

2018 America East Conference baseball standings
	Conf.						Overall
Team	W		L		T	PCT	W		L		T	PCT
Hartford ‍†‍‡‍^{y}	16	–	8	–	0	.667	26	–	31	–	0	.456
UMass Lowell ‍‍‍	13	–	11	–	0	.542	25	–	29	–	0	.463
UMBC ‍‍‍	12	–	11	–	0	.522	22	–	29	–	0	.431
Stony Brook ‍‍‍	12	–	12	–	0	.500	32	–	25	–	0	.561
Maine ‍‍‍	12	–	12	–	0	.500	20	–	34	–	0	.370
Albany ‍‍‍	9	–	14	–	0	.391	20	–	28	–	0	.417
Binghamton ‍‍‍	9	–	15	–	0	.375	18	–	30	–	1	.378
† – Conference champion ‡ – Tournament champion y – Invited to the NCAA tournament As of June 30, 2018; Rankings from Collegiate Baseball

The 2018 America East Conference baseball tournament was held from May 23 to 26, 2018. The top six teams out of the league's seven members met in the double-elimination tournament held at Mahaney Diamond in Orono, Maine, the home park of Maine. As tournament champion, Hartford received the conference's automatic bid into the 2018 NCAA Division I baseball tournament.

== Seeding and format ==
The top six teams from the regular season are seeded one through six based on conference winning percentage only. The No. 1 and No. 2 seeds receive a first-round bye. The teams then play a double-elimination tournament.

== Bracket ==
First round Wednesday, May 23	Second round Thursday, May 24	Third round Friday, May 25	Championship; Saturday, May 26
1	Hartford	2
4	Stony Brook	2	4	Stony Brook	0
5	Maine	1	1	Hartford	4
2	UMass Lowell	3
2	UMass Lowell	4
6	Albany	8	6	Albany	0
3	UMBC	5
1	Hartford	9	–
4	Stony Brook	4	–
Lower round 1	Lower round 2	Lower round 3	Lower final
2	UMass Lowell	5
4	Stony Brook	11	4	Stony Brook	6
5	Maine	6	5	Maine	4
5	Maine	9	6	Albany	1
3	UMBC	4
