= 2018 Hartford Hawks baseball team =

American college baseball season

2018 Hartford Hawks baseball

America East regular season and tournament champions

Chapel Hill Regional, 0–2
- Conference: America East Conference
- Record: 26–31 (16–8 America East)
- Head coach: Justin Blood (7th season)
- Home stadium: Fiondella Field 1,000; Dunkin' Donuts Park 6,056

2018 America East Conference baseball standings
	Conf.						Overall
Team	W		L		T	PCT	W		L		T	PCT
Hartford ‍†‍‡‍^{y}	16	–	8	–	0	.667	26	–	31	–	0	.456
UMass Lowell ‍‍‍	13	–	11	–	0	.542	25	–	29	–	0	.463
UMBC ‍‍‍	12	–	11	–	0	.522	22	–	29	–	0	.431
Stony Brook ‍‍‍	12	–	12	–	0	.500	32	–	25	–	0	.561
Maine ‍‍‍	12	–	12	–	0	.500	20	–	34	–	0	.370
Albany ‍‍‍	9	–	14	–	0	.391	20	–	28	–	0	.417
Binghamton ‍‍‍	9	–	15	–	0	.375	18	–	30	–	1	.378
† – Conference champion ‡ – Tournament champion y – Invited to the NCAA tournament As of June 30, 2018; Rankings from Collegiate Baseball

The 2018 Hartford Hawks baseball team represented the University of Hartford in the 2018 NCAA Division I baseball season as a member of the America East Conference. The team was coached by Justin Blood and played their home games at Fiondella Field with select games being played at Dunkin' Donuts Park. 2018 was the most successful season in division one for Hartford baseball. Hartford captured the America East regular season and conference tournament championships for the first time in school history and advanced to the NCAA tournament.

== Roster ==
2018 Hartford Hawks baseball team
Players
Coaches

#	Pos.	Name	B/T	Height	Weight	Year	Previous school	Home town
2	INF	Jackson Olson	L/R	6 ft 2 in (1.88 m)	190 lb (86 kg)	So	New Milford	New Milford, CT
5	C	Robert Carmody	R/R	5 ft 10 in (1.78 m)	190 lb (86 kg)	So	Thayer Academy	Hingham, MA
6	OF	John Thrasher	R/R	6 ft 1 in (1.85 m)	170 lb (77 kg)	Fr	Ridgefield	Ridgefield, CT
10		Bryce Walker	R/R	5 ft 10 in (1.78 m)	190 lb (86 kg)	So	Milford	Milford, NH
13	LHP	Jack Rose	L/L	6 ft 5 in (1.96 m)	205 lb (93 kg)	Fr	Masuck	Monroe, CT
15	RHP	Joe Grassett	R/R	5 ft 10 in (1.78 m)	145 lb (66 kg)	So	Souhegan	Amherst, NH
18	RHP	Peter Myers	R/R	6 ft 1 in (1.85 m)	180 lb (82 kg)	Fr	Master's School	Canton, CT
19	RHP	Jarod Norcross Plourde	R/R	6 ft 2 in (1.88 m)	195 lb (88 kg)	Fr	Edward Little	Auburn, ME
21	LHP	Nicholas Dombkowski	L/L	6 ft 2 in (1.88 m)	195 lb (88 kg)	Fr	West Springfield	West Springfield, MA
24	INF	Drew DeMartino	R/R	6 ft 0 in (1.83 m)	180 lb (82 kg)	Jr	Taconic	Pittsfield, MA
25	RHP	James Judenis	R/R	6 ft 5 in (1.96 m)	230 lb (104 kg)	Fr	Cheshire Academy	Wallingford, CT
26	RHP	Alex Moconyi	R/R	6 ft 6 in (1.98 m)	225 lb (102 kg)	RS So	Sheehan	Wallingford, CT
28	RHP	Tyler Coppo	R/R	6 ft 2 in (1.88 m)	210 lb (95 kg)	RS Fr	Monadnock	Fitzwilliam, NH
31	RHP	Nathan Florence	R/R	6 ft 2 in (1.88 m)	200 lb (91 kg)	RS So	Minnechaug	Wilbraham, MA
33	OF	Tim Dickson	R/L	5 ft 10 in (1.78 m)	165 lb (75 kg)	RS So	Xavier	Middletown, CT
35	RHP	Jason Johndrow	R/R	6 ft 2 in (1.88 m)	190 lb (86 kg)	RS Jr	Silver Lake	Halifax, MA

Head coach

Justin Blood (Franklin Pierce)

Assistant coach(es)

Legend

- (C) Team captain
- (S) Suspended
- (I) Ineligible
- Injured
- Current redshirt

Roster

== Schedule and results ==
2018 Hartford Hawks baseball game log
Regular season (26–31)

May
Date	Opponent	Rank (CB)	Site/stadium	Score	Win	Loss	Save	TV	Attendance	Overall record	America East Record
May 5	UMBC		Fiondella field	W 9–7							
May 5	UMBC		Fiondella Field	W 4–2							
May 6	UMBC		Fiondella Field	W 5–1							
May 12	Stony Brook		Joe Nathan Field	L 5–8							
May 12	Stony Brook		Joe Nathan Field	W 7–0							
May 13	Stony Brook		Joe Nathan Field	L 2–3							
May 16	Central Connecticut; Rivalry		Dunkin' Donuts Park	W 3–0					516		
May 18	Maine		Mahaney Diamond; Orono, ME	W 9–2							
May 18	Maine		Mahaney Diamond	L 1–3							
May 19	Maine		Mahaney Diamond	W 12–7							

NCAA tournament – Chapel Hill Regional
Date	Opponent	Rank	Site/stadium	Score	Win	Loss	Save	TV	Attendance	Overall record	America East Record
June 1	Stetson; DeLand Regional		Melching Field at Conrad Park; Deland, FL	L 3–8							
June 2	South Florida; DeLand Regional		Melching Field at Conrad Park; Deland, FL	L 4–9							
