= Harcourt-Vernon =

Harcourt-Vernon is a surname:

- Granville Harcourt-Vernon (1792–1879), British politician
- Granville Harcourt-Vernon (1816–1861), British politician

== See also ==
- Vernon-Harcourt
- Venables-Vernon-Harcourt
- Harcourt (surname)
- Vernon family
