= Ari Schwartz =

American adviser

Ari M. Schwartz
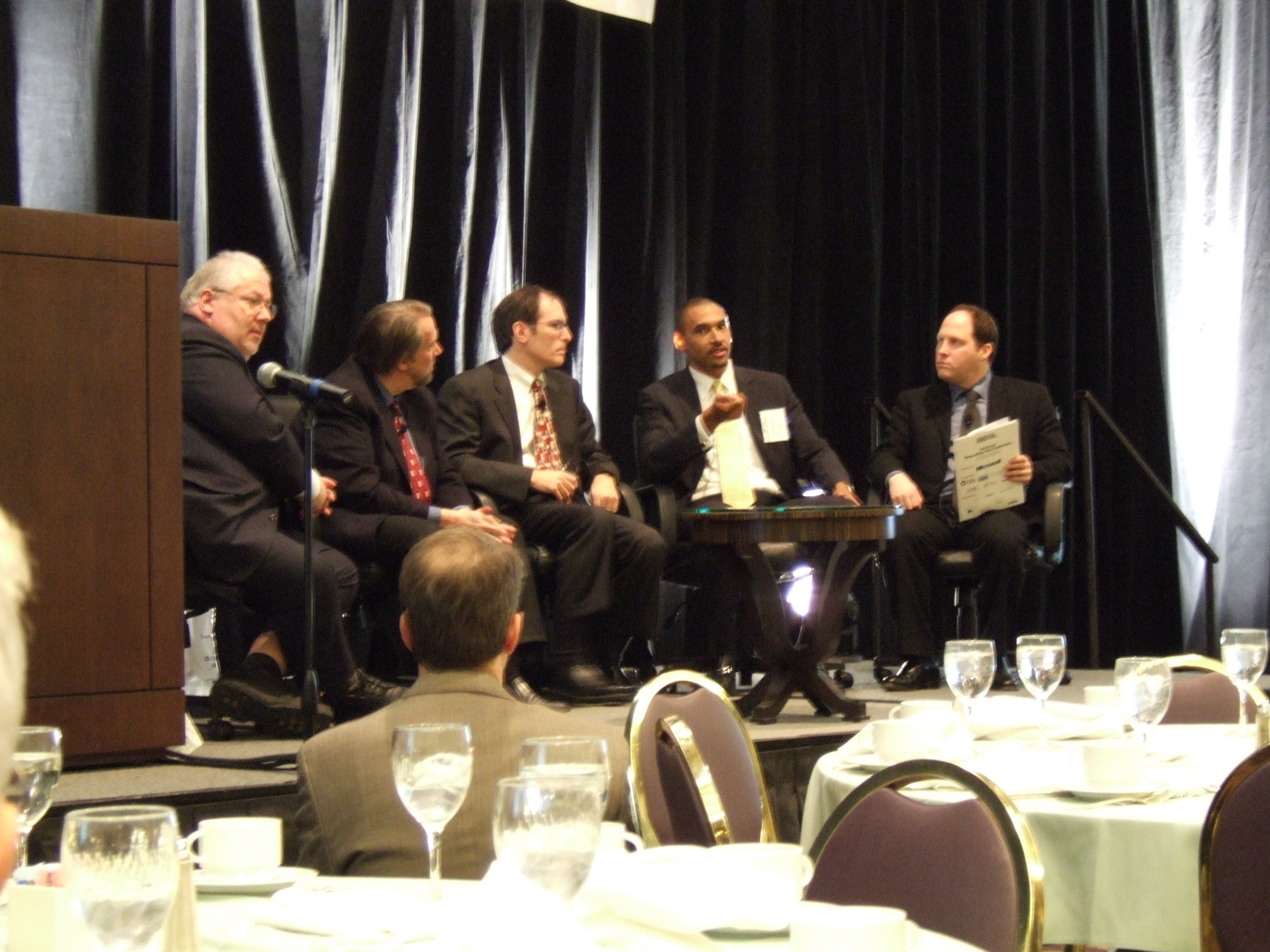
- Schwartz (right) participating in a State of the Net panel in Washington, D.C.
- Born: Detroit, MI
- Education: Brandeis University
- Occupation: Cybersecurity advisor
- Years active: 1996 - present
- Employer: Venable
- Known for: NIST Cybersecurity framework Vulnerabilities Equities Process

Ari M. Schwartz is an American cybersecurity and technology policy expert. He is the former Special Assistant to the President and senior director for cybersecurity on the United States National Security Council Staff at the White House, having left the role in October 2015. Previously, Schwartz worked in both the Executive Branch and civil society as on cybersecurity, privacy, civil liberties, and policy. He is an advocate for vulnerability disclosure programs.

== Career ==
Schwartz came to the White House after serving as a Senior Advisor for technology policy to the United States Secretary of Commerce. Previously, he was at the National Institute of Standards and Technology where he served as Internet Policy Advisor, working on the Internet Policy Task Force at the Department of Commerce.

Before his government service, Schwartz was the vice president and chief operating officer of the Center for Democracy and Technology (CDT) in Washington, D.C., in the United States. He was formerly a CDT senior policy analyst and subsequently the center's Vice President and COO.

While at CDT, Schwartz won the RSA conference award for Excellence in Public Policy, and the Online Trust Alliance Award for Excellence in Public Policy.

In October 2015, it was revealed that Schwartz had stepped down from his role as senior director for cybersecurity after a two-year tenure. He remarked that he had always planned to leave the role after this period. Schwartz was praised on his departure for helping to develop the government's cybersecurity framework, a voluntary guideline to help companies bolster their security programs, and as an honest broker with industry and civil society.

Schwartz currently works at the law firm Venable, where he is the Managing Director of Cybersecurity Services.

== Personal life ==
Schwartz is from the Detroit, Michigan area, and holds a bachelor's degree in sociology from Brandeis University.
