= Abraham Venable =

Abraham Venable may refer to:

- Abraham B. Venable (1758–1811), U.S. Congressman and senator from Virginia
- Abraham Watkins Venable (1799–1876), U.S. and Confederate Congressman from North Carolina

== See also ==
- Venable, persons sharing the surname
