= Justin Blood =

American baseball coach and player (born 1979)

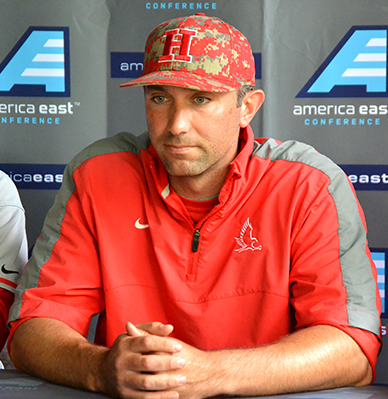
- Blood in 2014

Current position
- Title: Head coach
- Team: Keene State
- Conference: Little East
- Record: 0–0

Biographical details
- Born: November 20, 1979 (age 46); Keene, New Hampshire

Playing career
- 1999–2001: Franklin Pierce

Coaching career (HC unless noted)
- 2003: Quinnipiac (Asst.)
- 2004–2005: Franklin Pierce (Asst.)
- 2006–2011: Connecticut (Asst.)
- 2012–2021: Hartford
- 2022–present: Keene State

Head coaching record
- Overall: 223–297
- Tournaments: American East: 9–10; NCAA: 0–2

Accomplishments and honors

Championships
- America East Tournament (2018)

Awards
- America East Conference Coach of the Year (2018)

Justin Blood (born November 20, 1979) is an American baseball coach and former player, who is the current head baseball coach of the Keene State Owls. He played college baseball at Franklin Pierce from 1999 to 2001. He then served as the head coach of the Hartford Hawks (2012–2021).

== Playing career ==
Blood pitched for three seasons at Franklin Pierce. In 2000, he played collegiate summer baseball with the Orleans Cardinals of the Cape Cod Baseball League. Blood become the first baseball player ever drafted from Franklin Pierce, being selected by the Seattle Mariners in the 9th round of the 2001 MLB draft. He played three seasons in the Mariners organization, reaching Class-A.

== Coaching career ==
After ending his playing career, Blood became an assistant coach at Quinnipiac before spending the next two years at Franklin Pierce completing his degree and serving as a student assistant. From 2006 through 2011, Blood served on the staff of Jim Penders at UConn, later adding recruiting coordinator and associate head coach duties. He was responsible for recruiting players including Mike Olt, Matt Barnes, and George Springer, and helped the Huskies to a pair of regionals and a super regional while his pitching staffs ranked among the nation's best. He was hired at Hartford during the Huskies 2011 NCAA tournament run, and has been tabbed one of the nation's top 10 under 40 head coaches by Baseball America.

In 2012 and 2013, Blood's first two seasons at Hartford, the Hawks had losing records and missed the conference tournament. In 2014, however, Hartford went 31–23 and qualified for the America East tournament, where they went 1–2. It was Hartford's first winning season since 1992 and first postseason appearance since 1996. Following the season, Blood signed a five-year contract extension through the 2019 season.

== Head coaching record ==
This table depicts Blood's record as a head coach.

Record table
Season	Team	Overall	Conference	Standing	Postseason
Hartford Hawks (America East Conference) (2012–2021)
2012	Hartford	16–40	7–17	5th	
2013	Hartford	17–36	13–17	5th	
2014	Hartford	31–23	16–7	2nd	America East tournament
2015	Hartford	23–31	10–12	5th	America East tournament
2016	Hartford	37–18	14–9	2nd	America East tournament
2017	Hartford	20–30	8–13	7th	America East tournament
2018	Hartford	26–31	16–8	1st	NCAA Regional
2019	Hartford	23–34	11–13	6th	America East tournament
2020	Hartford	6–6	0–0		Season canceled because of COVID-19
2021	Hartford	18–20	18–20	T-3rd (Division A)	
Hartford:		217–269	113–116		
Keene State Owls (Little East Conference) (2022–present)
2022	Keene State	6–28	2–14		
2023	Keene State	13-25	3-13		
2024	Keene State	21-22	8-8		
Keene State:		40–75	13–35		
Total:		247–343			
National champion Postseason invitational champion Conference regular season champion Conference regular season and conference tournament champion Division regular season champion Division regular season and conference tournament champion Conference tournament champion
