= Vernon-Harcourt =

Vernon-Harcourt is a surname:

- Augustus George Vernon Harcourt (1834–1919), English chemist
- Edward Vernon Harcourt (1825–1891), English politician and naturalist
- George Vernon Harcourt (1874–1934), Ontario politician
- Leveson Francis Vernon-Harcourt (1839–1907), British civil engineer
- Lewis Vernon Harcourt, 1st Viscount Harcourt (1863–1922), British politician
- Octavius Vernon Harcourt (1793–1863), British naval officer
- William Vernon Harcourt (disambiguation), several people

== Other ==
- Mount Vernon Harcourt, Antarctic mountain

== See also ==
- Harcourt-Vernon
- Venables-Vernon-Harcourt
- Harcourt (surname)
- Vernon family
