= Jim Bretz =

American baseball coach and scout

Biographical details
- Born: April 11, 1964 (age 62); Lexington, North Carolina
- Education: University of North Carolina at Charlotte '87

Playing career
- 1982-1987: Charlotte
- Position: IF

Coaching career (HC unless noted)
- 1988–1990: UNC Asheville (asst.)
- 1991–1994: UNC Asheville
- 1995–1997: Hartford

Head coaching record
- Overall: 121-192-1
- Tournaments: NAC/AEC: 2-2; Big South: 3-4

Jim Bretz (born April 11, 1964) is an American baseball scout and former college baseball coach. He is the Northeast Scouting Director for the Detroit Tigers and was previously the head coach of UNC Asheville (1991–1994) and Hartford (1995–1997).

== Playing career ==
Bretz played college baseball at Charlotte under head coach Gary Robinson from 1984–1987. During this stretch, the 49ers had two 30-win seasons and made two Sun Belt Tournaments. Bretz's teammates at Charlotte included future Major League umpire Fieldin Culbreth.

== Coaching career ==
=== UNC Asheville ===
Bretz began his coaching career as an assistant at UNC Asheville from 1988–1990. He was promoted to head coach for the 1991 season and held the position from 1991–1994.

Under Bretz, Asheville finished 5th in the Big South Conference in 1991 and 1992, appearing in the Big South Tournament in both seasons. Its deepest tournament run came in 1991, when the team went 19-29. It started the tournament 3-0, with wins over #3 Winthrop, #2 Augusta, and #4 Davidson. In the championship round, however, it lost two games to top-seeded Coastal Carolina and finished as the tournament runner-up. In Bretz's final two seasons, 1993 and 1994, the Bulldogs did not qualify for the conference tournament. His overall record at Asheville was 73-114.

The Bulldogs had a player named to the All-Big South Team in each of Bretz's seasons, and three players signed professional contracts during his tenure. Pitcher Marc Rosenbalm, who was named to the Big South's all-conference and all-tournament teams in 1991, signed a free agent contract with the Seattle Mariners following the season. Jamon Deal and Eugene Faircloth were both selected in the 1992 MLB draft and played in the minor leagues.

Bretz's coaching staffs at Asheville included Sammy Stewart, an ex-Major League pitcher attempting a comeback from cocaine addiction. Stewart served as a volunteer assistant coach in 1991. Bretz said of Stewart in a press interview: "I'd heard all about his drug and alcohol problems, but the guy just made a mistake. You could see in his face that he wanted to make a commitment. He's been a real inspiration to my kids."

=== Hartford ===
Prior to the start of the 1995 season, Bretz was hired as the head coach of Hartford, a position he held from 1995–1997. Hartford athletic director Pat Meiser-McKnett said of the hire, "[Bretz] is a seasoned Division I coach who we believe understands the broad picture of college athletics. Jim also brings to the program a high level of energy and integrity."

In 1995, Bretz's first season, the Hawks went 14-25 (10-12 NAC). Prior to the season, many players that had played for or been recruited by previous head coach Moe Morhardt quit the program. The team played the season with a 16-man roster. Bretz said of the season: "I got rid of some problems and some players cut themselves. We wanted to find out who was going to be the backbone of the team. ... We were planning for the future: 'This is how we'll play, conduct ourselves on the road and handle tough situations. We didn't have a chance to win. We had a five-man pitching staff. You have to give credit to the guys who stuck it out."

Hartford's best season under Bretz was 1996, when the team went 18-30-1 (10-14 NAC) and reached the NAC Tournament, where the Hawks finished third. After losing their opener to top-seeded Delaware, Hartford defeated #5 Northeastern and #2 Maine before being eliminated by Drexel. Following the 1997 season, in which Hartford missed the conference tournament, Bretz resigned for personal reasons. His overall record in three seasons at Hartford was 48-78-1.

At Hartford, Bretz coached future Major Leaguer Earl Snyder, who played for the program from 1995–1998. Snyder played for the Cleveland Indians in 2002 and the Boston Red Sox in 2004. At Hartford, he set career records for home runs and RBI and was named to multiple all-conference and all-region teams.

Bretz was a proponent of changing college baseball's bat rules while at Hartford. In 1996, the Richmond Times-Dispatch quoted him on the minus-5's then in use: "Across the board, something needs to be done. Somebody is going to get killed [because of metallic bats]. It's going to happen. I guess we'll keep buying those bats until it does." In 1999, the NCAA adopted BESR standards to reduce the exit speed of baseballs off the bat. The NCAA made further reductions in bats' liveliness in the years following these new standards.

== Scouting career ==
Bretz began working as a scout in the 2000s. He was the Northeast Supervisor for the Cleveland Indians from 2000–2001, and for the San Diego Padres from 2001-2015. He has held the same position for the Detroit Tigers since 2015. His signees include Will Venable, Andy Parrino, Brad Brach, Travis Jankowski, Luke Carlin, Nick Greenwood, Brett Kennedy, Brendan White, Jason Foley, Kevin McGonigle, and Ben Malgeri.

== Head coaching record ==
Below is a table of Bretz's yearly records as a collegiate head baseball coach.

Record table
Season	Team	Overall	Conference	Standing	Postseason
UNC Asheville Bulldogs (Big South Conference) (1991–1994)
1991	UNC Asheville	19–29	7–8	5th	Big South Tournament
1992	UNC Asheville	20–28	8–10	5th	Big South Tournament
1993	UNC Asheville	19–27	6–14	9th	
1994	UNC Asheville	15–30	8–19	10th	
UNC Asheville:		73–114	29–51		
Hartford Hawks (North Atlantic Conference / America East Conference (Note: The America East Conference was known as the North Atlantic Conference through the end of the 1996 season.)) (1995–1997)
1995	Hartford	14–25	10–12	7th	
1996	Hartford	18–30–1	10–14	6th	NAC Tournament
1997	Hartford	16–23	7–16	T–7th	
Hartford:		48–78–1	27–42		
Total:		121–192–1			

== Personal ==
Bretz's father, James, worked as a scout for the Pittsburgh Pirates, among several other areas of professional baseball.
