= Harvey Shapiro (baseball) =

American baseball coach

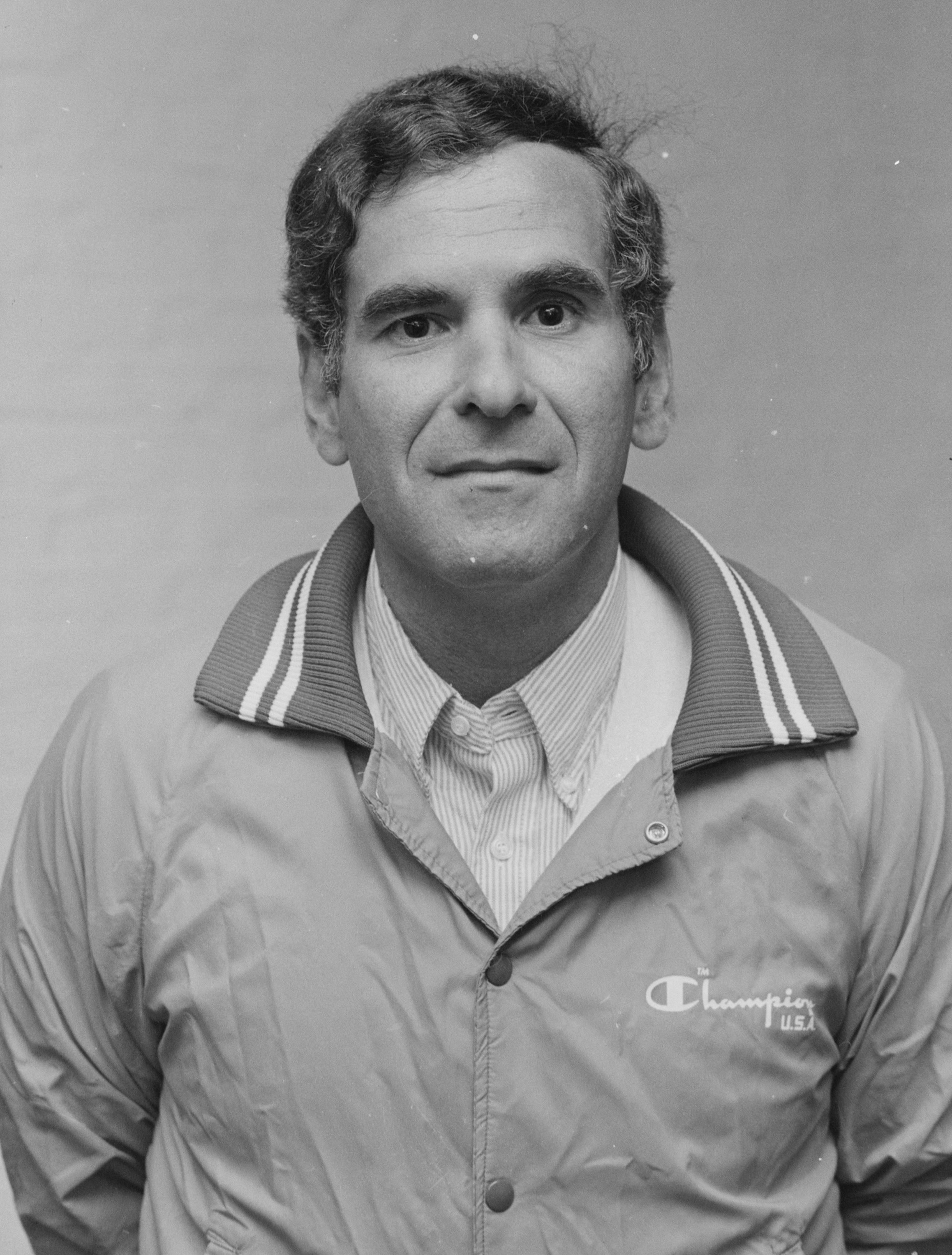
- Shapiro in 1985

Biographical details
- Born: 1947 or 1948 (age 78–79); New Britain, Connecticut, U.S.

Playing career

Baseball
- 1967–1970: Connecticut

Coaching career (HC unless noted)

Baseball
- c. 1975: Springfield (assistant)
- 1984–1998: Bowdoin
- 1999–2004: Hartford

Women's basketball
- 1976–1977: Springfield
- 1980–1983: Springfield
- 1983–1998: Bowdoin

Head coaching record
- Overall: 265–392–6 (baseball); 65–27 (women's basketball)
Medal record
Men's baseball
Gold medal – first place	1985 European Championship	Team

Harvey Shapiro (born 1947 or 1948) is an American college baseball coach, and former manager of the Netherlands national baseball team and the Bourne Braves. He was most recently head coach of the Wareham Gatemen of the Cape Cod Baseball League in 2022.

A native of New Britain, Connecticut, Shapiro played college baseball for the UConn Huskies under coach Larry Panciera. He graduated from UConn in 1970 with a degree in accounting, later earning a master's degree in physical education from Springfield College in 1975.

Shapiro was an assistant baseball coach at Springfield under coach Archie Allen from the mid 1970s to the early 1980s, and also served as the school's head women's basketball coach in 1976–1977 and again from 1980 to 1983, compiling a 65–27 record over four seasons on the Springfield hardwood. While at Springfield, he taught baseball in South Africa and Rhodesia in the fall of 1974. Shapiro He also managed the Amstel Tijgers in the Honkbal Hoofdklasse, the Netherlands' top baseball league, in the early 1980s. He became head baseball coach at Bowdoin College in 1984 and remained at that post for 15 seasons through 1998, simultaneously leading Bowdoin's women's basketball program as head coach for the same period. He also managed the Netherlands national baseball team from 1984 to 1986, leading the club to win the 1985 European Baseball Championship and two appearances in the Amateur World Series. He became head baseball coach at the University of Hartford in 1999 and led the team for six seasons through 2004.

Shapiro's long association with the Cape Cod Baseball League (CCBL) began in the late 1980s with assistant coaching jobs with the Yarmouth-Dennis Red Sox and Wareham Gatemen. He went on to skipper the Falmouth Commodores from 1994 to 1998, winning the league's coach of the year honors in 1996. Shapiro took the helm of the Bourne Braves in 2003, a post where he remained through 2021. At Bourne, he coached dozens of future major league stars such as Pete Alonso, Mitch Moreland and Tommy La Stella, and led the club to its first league championship in 2009. Following the 2021 season, Shapiro left Bourne to return to Wareham as field manager. Shapiro was inducted into the CCBL's Hall of Fame as part of its 2020 class.

Shapiro was inducted into the Maine Baseball Hall of Fame in 2019.

== Head coaching record ==
=== Baseball ===
The following is a table of Shapiro's yearly records as an NCAA head baseball coach.

Record table
Season	Team	Overall	Conference	Standing	Postseason
Bowdoin Polar Bears (New England Small College Athletic Conference) (1984–1998)
1984	Bowdoin	13–12			
1985	Bowdoin	15–17			
1986	Bowdoin	15–15			
1987	Bowdoin	9–18			
1988	Bowdoin	7–18			
1989	Bowdoin	7–11			
1990	Bowdoin	10–13			
1991	Bowdoin	17–8			
1992	Bowdoin	12–11			
1993	Bowdoin	13–10–1			
1994	Bowdoin	11–12			
1995	Bowdoin	14–14–2			
1996	Bowdoin	15–12–1			
1997	Bowdoin	17–8			
1998	Bowdoin	14–14–1			
Bowdoin:		189–193–5			
Hartford Hawks (America East Conference) (1999–2004)
1999	Hartford	12–34	7–20	8th	
2000	Hartford	13–34	6–22	8th	
2001	Hartford	14–35	10–18	8th	
2002	Hartford	17–29	8–14	7th	
2003	Hartford	9–34–1	7–15	6th	
2004	Hartford	11–33	5–16	8th	
Hartford:		76–199–1	43–105		
Total:		265–392–6			

== Personal life ==
Shapiro and his wife have four children.
