= Venables-Vernon =

Venables-Vernon is a surname:

- George Venables-Vernon, 1st Baron Vernon (1709–1780), British politician
- George Venables-Vernon, 2nd Baron Vernon (1735–1813), British politician
- George John Venables-Vernon, 5th Baron Vernon (1803–1866)

== See also ==
- Venables-Vernon-Harcourt
- Vernon family
- Venables
