= Winston Venable =

American gridiron football player and coach (born 1987)

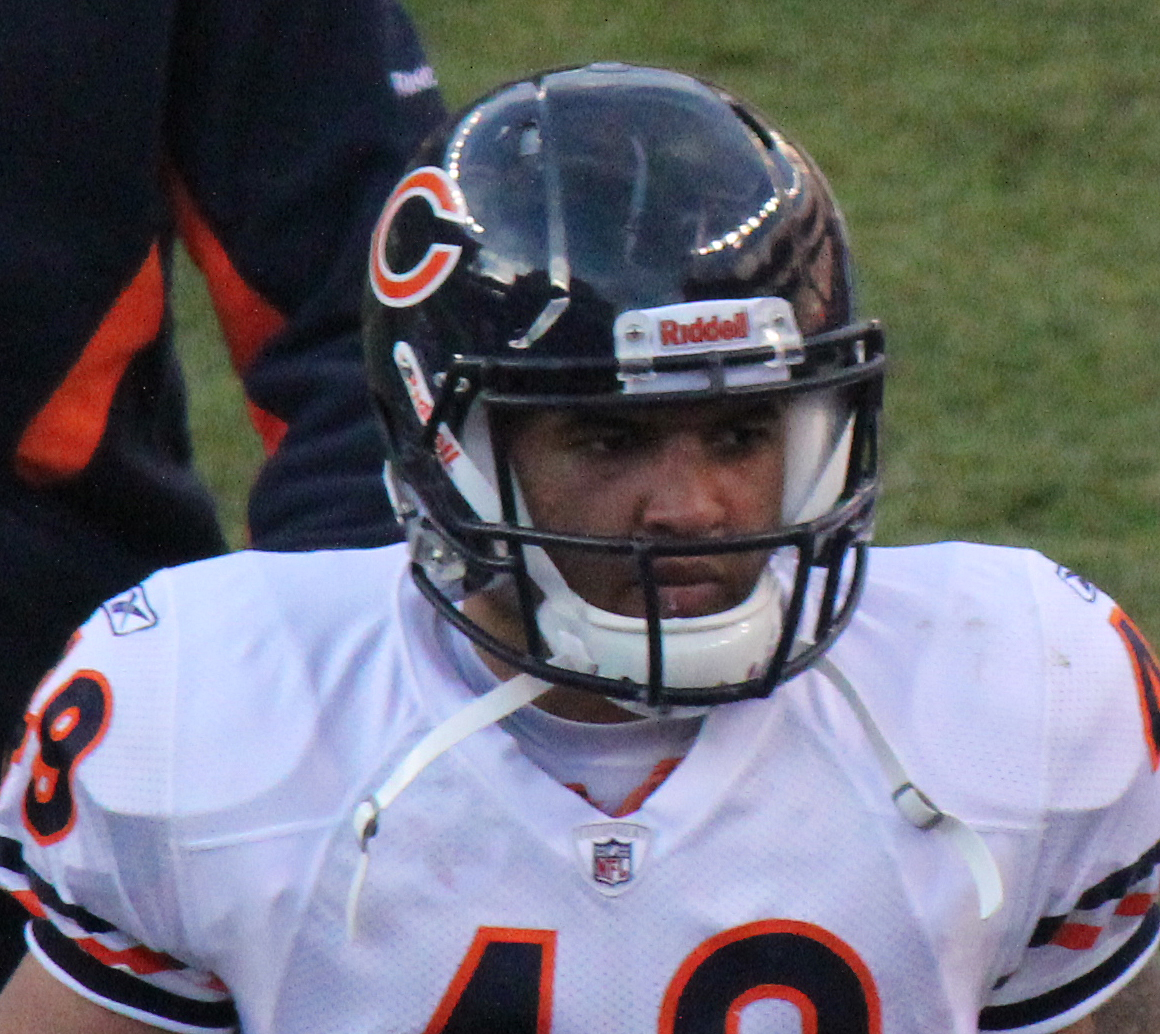
- Venable during the 2011 NFL season.

Boise State Broncos
- Title: Running backs coach

Personal information
- Born: March 31, 1987 (age 39); San Rafael, California, U.S.
- Listed height: 5 ft 11 in (1.80 m)
- Listed weight: 220 lb (100 kg)

Career information
- High school: St. Thomas (CT)
- College: Glendale Community College (2007-2008); Boise State (2009-2010)
- NFL draft: 2011: undrafted

Career history

Playing
- Chicago Bears (2011); Montreal Alouettes (2012–2016); Toronto Argonauts (2017)*
- * Offseason or practice squad member only

Coaching
- Boise State (2018) Player development coordinator; Boise State (2019) Assistant director of player performance; Boise State (2020) Running backs coach/co-special teams coordinator; Boise State (2021–2022) Running backs coach/player development director

Awards and highlights
- CFL All-Star (2015); CFL East All-Star (2015)

Career NFL statistics
- Games played: 12
- Total tackles: 8
- Stats at Pro Football Reference

Career CFL statistics
- Tackles: 272
- Sacks: 8
- Forced fumbles: 4
- Fumble recoveries: 5
- Defensive touchdowns: 1

Winston Venable (born March 31, 1987) is an American football coach and former linebacker who is currently the running backs coach and player development director at Boise State University. He spent the majority of his professional career with the Montreal Alouettes of the Canadian Football League (CFL). He also spent time in the NFL with the Chicago Bears. He played college football for Boise State University. He is the son of former Major League Baseball (MLB) player Max Venable as well as the younger brother of Chicago White Sox manager Will Venable.

== Early life ==
Venable attended San Rafael High School before transferring to St. Thomas More School in Oakdale, CT. He then went on to Glendale Community College before transferring to Boise State in the spring of 2009. After transferring, Venable immediately earned a spot on the Broncos roster for the upcoming season. He would go on to start all 14 games that season. He first made an impact in an early season game against Fresno State when he recorded the first score of the game off a 30-yard interception returned for a touchdown. He is remembered by many fans for his hit on Fresno quarterback Ryan Colburn later in that same game, in which he launched himself head first, leaping over a would-be blocker, narrowly missing a sack.

=== 2010 Fiesta Bowl ===
After an undefeated regular season the Broncos were matched up against fellow undefeated TCU to play in the Tostitos Fiesta Bowl. Despite being a relatively low scoring game, the final minutes became exciting after a fake punt attempt by the Broncos led to a score. With a 17–10 lead, 1:06 remaining on the clock and TCU on their own 1-yard line, the Broncos simply needed to prevent a touchdown. But TCU, led by quarterback Andy Dalton covered nearly 70 yards in under 45 seconds, setting themselves up for a potential game tying score. However, on the ensuing play Dalton threw a pass towards the left sideline which was intercepted by Venable to seal the victory.

== Professional career ==
=== NFL ===
==== Chicago Bears ====
On July 27, 2011, following the resolution of a labor dispute between the NFL Players Association and team owners, Venable was signed by the Chicago Bears as an undrafted free agent. On September 9, 2011, Venable was fined $20,000 by the NFL for a hit he delivered on Cleveland Browns receiver Demetrius Williams in the team's final preseason game. On May 3, 2012, the Bears decided to waive him after selecting free safety Brandon Hardin in the 2012 NFL draft. Despite his short tenure on the Bears, Venable managed to carry over the reputation as a hard-hitting defensive back he had earned in college. Said Lance Briggs when discussing the Bears lack of consistency at the safety position during the 2011 season "So between those guys, and whoever gets back there and plays, even if it's Winston Venable, I know one thing that Winston's going to do. He's going to hit somebody. So we're confident in the guys we have back there."

=== CFL ===
==== Montreal Alouettes ====
On October 3, 2012, Venable signed with the Montreal Alouettes of the Canadian Football League. In 2014, he amassed 52 defensive tackles including a career-high of nine in a game against the Ottawa REDBLACKS. Venable also recovered a league-high four fumbles and recorded 14 special teams tackles. Venable continued to be a major contributor for the Als in the following two seasons, totaling 191 tackles and 12 sacks in 35 games. Following the 2016 season Venable was not re-signed by Montreal and became a free agent on February 14, 2017.

==== Toronto Argonauts ====
On February 15, 2017, Venable signed with the Toronto Argonauts of the Canadian Football League as a free agent. On May 31, 2017 (at the start of training camp), Venable announced his retirement.

== Coaching career ==
Following his retirement, Venable returned to Boise State to complete his degree. During that time, he often showed up at the Broncos practices and volunteering in various capabilities. Venable was hired to be the Broncos player development coordinator in June 2018. He was named the assistant director of player performance in 2019 and was later promoted to running backs coach and co-special teams coordinator in 2020.
