= James Venable (disambiguation) =

James Venable may refer to:

- James L. Venable (born 1967), American composer
- James R. Venable (1901–1993), American white supremacist
- James Venable, see History of general anesthesia
