= Hartford Hawks baseball =

Intercollegiate baseball program of the University of Hartford

- 2025 Hartford Hawks baseball team
- Founded: 1958; 68 years ago
- Overall record: 771–1320–9
- University: University of Hartford
- Head coach: Steve Malinowski (4th season)
- Conference: Conference of New England
- Location: West Hartford, Connecticut
- Home stadium: Fiondella Field 1,000; Dunkin' Park 6,056
- Nickname: Hawks
- Colors: Scarlet and white

NCAA tournament appearances
- 2018

Conference tournament champions
- 2018

Conference regular season champions
- 2018

The Hartford Hawks baseball team is the varsity intercollegiate baseball program of the University of Hartford, located in West Hartford, Connecticut. The program is a member of the NCAA Division III Conference of New England. The program was a member of the NCAA Division I America East Conference from 1985 to 2022. It has played home games at Fiondella Field since the venue opened at the start of the 2006 season.

== History ==
The Hartford Art School, Hartt College of Music, and Hillyer College merged to create the University of Hartford in February 1957. It began operation for the 1957–1958 school year. Although some Hartford athletic programs, such as men's basketball, trace their history to the teams of Hillyer College, records for the baseball program begin with the 1958 season.

=== Division II ===
1958 was the program's first season of competition. It competed as a member of the NCAA College Division, made up of small-school athletic programs. Throughout the 1960s and 1970s, the program competed as an Independent and played a schedule of between ten and twenty games each season.

The program's first head coach, Frank Klein, served in the position for three seasons (1958–1960). The program had a losing record in each season, and Klein's overall record was 14–29. He later became the first commissioner of the Connecticut Collegiate Summer Baseball League.

In 1961, Roger Wickman became the program's second head coach. In his first season, the program had its first winning record, going 7–5 in 1961. In 20 seasons as head coach, Wickman had six total winning seasons and finished with a career record of 146-178-5. Following the 1980 season, he stepped down from the head coaching position to become an administrator in Hartford's athletic department.

During Wickman's tenure (following the 1973 season), the NCAA had reorganized its divisions. The large-school University Division became Division I, while the small-school College Division split to become Divisions II and III. Hartford, which had competed as a College Division Independent, became a Division II Independent. It continued to compete as an Independent through Wickman's final season as head coach in 1980.

In the 1980–1981 academic year, Hartford became a charter member of the Northeast-7 Conference, along with American International College, Assumption College, Bentley College, Bryant College, Springfield College, and Stonehill College. The league became known as the Northeast-8 Conference when Saint Anselm College joined for the 1981–1982 academic year. In four seasons (1981–1984) as a member of the conference, Hartford had an overall record of 11–61, including winless seasons in 1983 and 1984.

=== Division I ===
For the start of the 1984–1985 academic year, Hartford's athletic programs transitioned to Division I, joining the ECAC. For the 1985 season, the program's first in Division I, it hired former Major League Baseball player Bill Denehy as its head coach. That season, the team went 2–24. In 1986, Denehy's second season, the team's record improved slightly to 8–34. Denehy was fired during his third season for making inflammatory comments following a game against UConn in which two brawls broke out. Athletic director Don Cook, assisted by Wickman, coached the team for the remainder of the season.

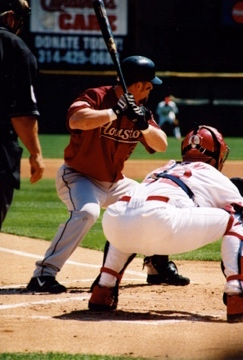
Bagwell with Major League Baseball's Houston Astros.

Prior to the start of the 1988 season, Hartford hired Quinnipiac head coach Dan Gooley as a permanent replacement for Denehy. In Gooley's first season, the Hawks went 29–12 and finished second in the ECAC Tournament. In 1989, the team went 17–15–1 to give the program consecutive winning seasons for the first time since 1971–1972. In 1992, the team went 27–21 and finished second in the North Atlantic Conference (which sponsored its first season of baseball in 1990), again appearing in the ECAC Tournament.

In the late 1980s, future Major League Baseball player Jeff Bagwell played three seasons for the program. Recruited by Denehy, Bagwell played under him in 1987, then under Gooley from 1988 to 1989. In 400 at bats with the program, Bagwell's batting average was .413, a program record. Bagwell was drafted by the Boston Red Sox in the fourth round of the 1989 MLB draft. He had a 15-year major league career with the Houston Astros in which he won a National League MVP Award and appeared in four All-Star Games.

Following the 1992 season, Gooley left Hartford to become a baseball corporate executive, and the program promoted assistant coach and former Major League player Moe Morhardt to replace him. Morhardt held the position for two seasons (1993–1994), in which the program won at least 20 games per season and made consecutive NAC tournament appearances. (Note: In this season, all members of the North Atlantic Conference qualified for its postseason tournament.) The team was eliminated in the opening round in the 1993 tournament. As the fifth seed in 1994, Hartford defeated fourth-seeded Maine in a best-of-three opening round. It then won its first two games in the double-elimination final round (5–1 against first-seeded Delaware and 6–5 against second-seeded Northeastern). The team then lost consecutive games to Northeastern in the championship round, however, and finished as the tournament runner-up. Morhardt resigned as head coach following the season.

UNC Asheville head coach Jim Bretz was hired to replace Morhardt, and Bretz held the position for three seasons (1995–1997). Under him, the program averaged only 16 wins per season and finished no higher than sixth in conference play. It qualified for the 1996 NAC tournament, in which it finished third. Bretz resigned following the 1997 season "for personal reasons," according to the university. Bob Nenna, one of Bretz's assistant coaches and a Hartford player from 1989 to 1992, led the team to a 13–32 record as interim head coach in 1998. Future Major League player Earl Snyder played under Bretz and Nenna from 1995 to 1998. Snyder set program career records for home runs (53) and runs batted in (173). Snyder later played for both the Cleveland Indians and Boston Red Sox.

From 1999 to 2011, the program had a pair of head coaches whose career winning percentages were below .300. Hartford hired Bowdoin and Falmouth Commodores head coach Harvey Shapiro for the start of the 1999 season. In six seasons (1999–2004), Shapiro's head coaching record was 76-199-1. Under him, the team finished no higher than sixth in conference play and did not qualify for an America East Tournament, which in 1998 had adopted a four-team format. Shapiro resigned following the 2004 season. Indiana assistant Jeff Calcaterra replaced Shapiro. Calcaterra held the position from the start of the 2005 season until partway through the 2011 season, when he was fired with an overall record of 79-236-1. At the start of the 2006 season, Calcaterra's second season, the program opened Fiondella Field, the program's first on-campus venue since the mid-1980s.

To replace Calcaterra, the program hired UConn assistant Justin Blood for the 2012 season. Commenting on Blood's hiring, Aaron Fitt of Baseball America called him "one of the top up-and-coming coaches in the Northeast." In both 2012 and 2013, Blood's first two seasons as head coach, the Hawks finished in fifth place in the America East. In 2014, Hartford went 31–23, finishing second in the America East; pitcher Sean Newcomb was named the America East Pitcher of the Year. The team qualified for the conference tournament, where the team went 1–2. It was Hartford's first winning season since 1992 and first postseason appearance since 1996. Following the season, three Hawks were selected in the 2014 Major League Baseball draft, including Newcomb, who was selected in the first round by the Los Angeles Angels. Newcomb was Hartford's highest draft pick ever, and the three draftees were the program's first since 2004. Following the season, Blood signed a five-year contract extension through the 2019 season.

=== Division III ===
On May 6, 2021, the University of Hartford Board of Regents voted to drop its athletic department to Division III. The drop was set to take place no later than September 1, 2025, and eventually occurred on that schedule.

=== Conference affiliations ===
- Independent (College Division/Division II) (1958–1980)
- Northeast-8 Conference (Division II) (1981–1984)
  - Known as the Northeast-7 Conference in 1981.
- Eastern Collegiate Athletic Conference (Division I) (1985–1989)
- America East Conference (Division I) (1990–2022)
  - Known as the North Atlantic Conference from 1990 to 1996.
- Independent (College Division/Division I) (2023)
- Conference of New England (Division III) (2024–present)
  - Known as the Commonwealth Coast Conference in 2024.

== Venues ==
=== Early venues ===
In its early years as a Division II program, Hartford played home games on campus. It began to use off-campus venues in the mid-1980s. These venues included New Britain's Beehive Field, Bristol's Muzzy Field, East Hartford's Ray McKenna Field, and Simsbury's Memorial Field.

=== Fiondella Field ===
Since it opened at the start of the 2006 season, on-campus Fiondella Field has been the program's home. It has a seating capacity of 1,000 spectators and an artificial turf surface.

=== Dunkin' Park ===
Opened in 2017 Dunkin' Park, formally Dunkin' Donuts Park has served as Hartford's second home stadium in downtown Hartford with a seating capacity of 6,056.

Date	Opponent	Result
April 11, 2017	Quinnipiac	W 6-4
May 7, 2017	Army	W 6-2
March 31, 2018	CCSU	W 2-1
March 31, 2018	UConn	L 1-0
May 1, 2018	UMass	L 11-4
May 16, 2018	CCSU	W 3-0

== Year-by-year records ==
Below is a table of the program's yearly records as both a Division II and Division I program.

Season	Coach	Overall	Conference	Standing	Postseason
Frank Klein (Independent) (1958–1960)
1958	Frank Klein	4–8			
1959	Frank Klein	5–11			
1960	Frank Klein	5–10			
Frank Klein:		14–29			
Roger Wickman (Independent) (1961–1980)
1961	Roger Wickman	7–5			
1962	Roger Wickman	9–6			
1963	Roger Wickman	8–7–1			
1964	Roger Wickman	9–8			
1965	Roger Wickman	8–8–1			
1966	Roger Wickman	4–9			
1967	Roger Wickman	1–11			
1968	Roger Wickman	8–9			
1969	Roger Wickman	7–9			
1970	Roger Wickman	10–10–1			
1971	Roger Wickman	10–9			
1972	Roger Wickman	8–4–1			
1973	Roger Wickman	5–10			
1974	Roger Wickman	8–4			
1975	Roger Wickman	8–10			
1976	Roger Wickman	8–10			
1977	Roger Wickman	4–15			
1978	Roger Wickman	9–11			
1979	Roger Wickman	10–10			
1980	Roger Wickman	5–13–1			
Roger Wickman:		146–187–5			
Bill Nardi (Northeast-10 Conference) (1981–1984)
1981	Bill Nardi	4–20			
1982	Bill Nardi	7–13			
1983	Bill Nardi	0–13			
Bill Nardi:		11–46			
Jim Keener (ECAC) (1984–1984)
1984	Jim Keener	0–15			
Jim Keener:		0–15			
Bill Denehy (ECAC) (1985–1987)
Division I
1985	Bill Denehy	2–24			
1986	Bill Denehy	8–34	2–12	6th	
1987	Bill Denehy/Don Cook (Note: Denehy was fired partway through the 1987 season, due to an altercation with a Connecticut assistant coach.)	11–27	4–9	6th	
Bill Denehy:		21–85	6–21		
Dan Gooley (ECAC) (1988–1992)
1988	Dan Gooley	29–12	9–5	2nd	ECAC Tournament
1989	Dan Gooley	17–15–1	9–6	2nd	
1990	Dan Gooley	15–20	4–10	6th	
1991	Dan Gooley	13–22	5–10	5th	
1992	Dan Gooley	27–21	18–10	2nd	ECAC Tournament
Dan Gooly:		101–90–1	45–41		
Moe Morhardt (North Atlantic) (1993–1994)
1993	Moe Morhardt	20–27	9–15	6th	NAC tournament
1994	Moe Morhardt	22–27	10–11	5th	NAC tournament
Moe Morhardt:		42–54	19–26		
Jim Bretz (North Atlantic/America East) (1995–1997)
1995	Jim Bretz	14–25	10–12	7th	
1996	Jim Bretz	18–30–1	10–14	6th	NAC tournament
1997	Jim Bretz	16–23	7–16	7th	
Jim Bretz:		48–78–1	27–42		
Bob Nenna (America East) (1998–1998)
1998	Bob Nenna	13–32	7–19	8th	
Bob Nenna:		13–32	7–19		
Harvey Shapiro (America East) (1999–2004)
1999	Harvey Shapiro	12–34	7–20	8th	
2000	Harvey Shapiro	13–34	6–22	8th	
2001	Harvey Shapiro	14–35	10–18	8th	
2002	Harvey Shapiro	17–29	8–14	7th	
2003	Harvey Shapiro	9–34–1	7–15	6th	
2004	Harvey Shapiro	11–33	5–16	8th	
Harvey Shapiro:		76–199–1	43–105		
Jeff Calcaterra (America East) (2005–2011)
2005	Jeff Calcaterra	6–30	3–18	8th	
2006	Jeff Calcaterra	11–38	8–16	6th	
2007	Jeff Calcaterra	15–34	9–14	6th	
2008	Jeff Calcaterra	18–31	10–13	5th	
2009	Jeff Calcaterra	15–32	7–15	6th	
2010	Jeff Calcaterra	11–37	5–19	5th	
2011	Jeff Calcaterra/Jerry Shank (Note: Calcaterra was fired partway through the 2011 season.)	6–43–1	3–20	5th	
Jeff Calcaterra:		82–245–1	45–115		
Justin Blood (America East) (2012–present)
2012	Justin Blood	16–40	7–17	5th	
2013	Justin Blood	17–36	13–17	5th	
2014	Justin Blood	31–23	16–7	2nd	
2015	Justin Blood	23–31	10–12	5th	
2016	Justin Blood	37–18	14–9	2nd	
2017	Justin Blood	20–30	8–13	8th	
2018	Justin Blood	26–31	16–8	1st	NCAA Regional
2019	Justin Blood	23–34	11–13		
2020	Justin Blood	6–6	0–0		Cancelled due to COVID-19
2021	Justin Blood	18–20	18–20	T-3rd (Division B)	
Justin Blood:		217–269	113–116		
Steve Malinowski () (2022–present)
2022	Steve Malinowski	13–37	11–19		
2023	Steve Malinowski	4–33			
Steve Malinowski (Commonwealth Coast Conference) (2024–2024)
2024	Steve Malinowski	11–24–1	6–10		
Steve Malinowski (Conference of New England) (2025–present)
2025	Steve Malinowski	20–22	6–7		
Steve Malinowski:		0–0	0–0		
Total:		771–1320–9			
National champion Postseason invitational champion Conference regular season champion Conference regular season and conference tournament champion Division regular season champion Division regular season and conference tournament champion Conference tournament champion

== NCAA Tournament ==
Hartford has participated in the NCAA Division I baseball tournament once.

Year	Region	Round	Opponent	Result
2018	DeLand Regional	First Round; Lower Round 1	Stetson; South Florida	L 3–8; L 4–9 (11)

== Awards ==
=== Conference awards ===
- America East Coach of the Year-Justin Blood (2018)

=== All-Americans ===
- Nicholas Dombkowski
- Nick Campana
- Sean Newcomb

== MLB draft ==
Year	Round	Pick	Name	Team
1975	14th	317	Gary LaRocque	Milwaukee Brewers
1985	21st	542	John Tuozzo	New York Mets
1989	4th	110	Jeff Bagwell	Boston Red Sox
1989	22nd	557	Pat Hedge	Baltimore Orioles
1989	33rd	769	Brian Crowley	Texas Rangers
1989	55th	1299	Mark Czarkowski	Seattle Mariners
1993	43rd	1207	Kurt Grashaw	St. Louis Cardinals
1994	29th	798	Scott LaRock	Colorado Rockies
1994	29th	799	Scott Hilt	Minnesota Twins
1998	36th	1084	Earl Snyder	New York Mets
2004	21st	627	Scott Roy	Toronto Blue Jays
2014	1st	15	Sean Newcomb	Los Angeles Angels
2014	9th	275	Brian Hunter	Cincinnati Reds
2014	30th	891	James Alfonso	Seattle Mariners
2015	35th	1059	Trey Stover	Kansas City Royals
2017	13th	379	Erik Ostberg	Tampa Bay Rays
2017	23rd	688	Ben Bengtson	Pittsburgh Pirates
2017	32nd	955	David MacKinnon	Los Angeles Angels
2018	20th	604	Seth Pinkerton	Minnesota Twins

=== Baseball Hall of Fame ===
Name	Teams	Position	Years	Inducted
Jeff Bagwell	Astros	1B	1987-1989	2017
Total MLB Hall of Famers – 1
