= 2014 America East Conference baseball tournament =

American college baseball tournament

- Teams: 4
- Format: Double-elimination
- Finals site: Edward A. LeLacheur Park; Lowell, Massachusetts
- Champions: Binghamton (3rd title)
- Winning coach: Tim Sinicki (3rd title)
- MVP: Shaun McGraw (Binghamton)

2014 America East Conference baseball standings
| | Conf. | | | | Overall |
| Team | W | | L | PCT | W | | L | PCT |
|---|---|---|---|---|---|---|---|---|
| Stony Brook ‍†‍‍ | 18 | – | 5 | .783 | 35 | – | 18 | .660 |
| Hartford ‍‍‍ | 16 | – | 7 | .696 | 31 | – | 23 | .574 |
| UMass Lowell ‍‍‍ | 10 | – | 10 | .500 | 20 | – | 22 | .476 |
| Binghamton ‍‍‡‍^{y} | 11 | – | 12 | .478 | 25 | – | 26 | .490 |
| Maine ‍‍‍ | 10 | – | 11 | .476 | 24 | – | 29 | .453 |
| UMBC ‍‍‍ | 7 | – | 17 | .292 | 17 | – | 29 | .370 |
| Albany ‍‍‍ | 7 | – | 17 | .292 | 12 | – | 33 | .267 |
† – Conference champion ‡ – Tournament champion y – Invited to the NCAA tournament As of June 6, 2014; Rankings from Collegiate Baseball

The 2014 America East Conference baseball tournament was held from May 21 through 23. The top four regular season finishers of the league's six teams met in the double-elimination tournament held at Edward A. LeLacheur Park in Lowell, Massachusetts, the home park of UMass Lowell. Binghamton won their third tournament championship, and second consecutive, to claim the America East Conference's automatic bid to the 2014 NCAA Division I baseball tournament.

== Seeding and format ==
The top four finishers from the regular season will be seeded one through four based on conference winning percentage only. The teams will play a double-elimination tournament. UMass Lowell, despite hosting the event, is not eligible to participate as it transitions from Division II. With one weekend left in the regular season, Stony Brook, Hartford, Maine, and Binghamton clinched berths in the Tournament.

| Team | W | L | Pct | GB | Seed |
|---|---|---|---|---|---|
| Stony Brook | 18 | 5 | .783 | – | 1 |
| Hartford | 16 | 7 | .696 | 2 | 2 |
| UMass Lowell | 10 | 10 | .500 | 6.5 | – |
| Binghamton | 11 | 12 | .478 | 7 | 3 |
| Maine | 10 | 11 | .476 | 7 | 4 |
| UMBC | 7 | 17 | .292 | 11.5 | – |
| Albany | 7 | 17 | .292 | 11.5 | – |

== Bracket ==
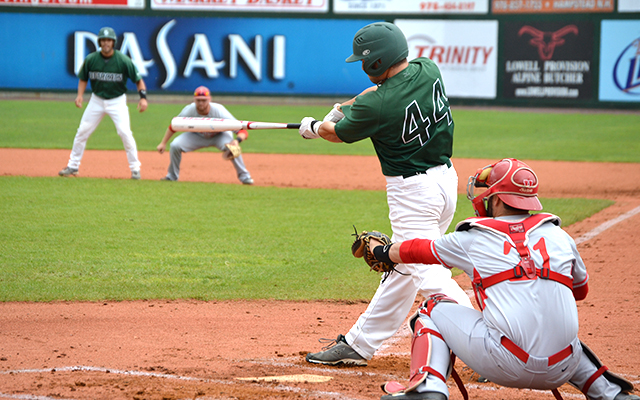
A game between Hartford and eventual champion Binghamton

Upper round 1
1 | Stony Brook | 4
4 | Maine | 1
2 | Hartford | 6
3 | Binghamton | 1
Lower round 1
4 | Maine | 3
3 | Binghamton | 6

Upper final
1 | Stony Brook | 10
2 | Hartford | 6
Lower final
2 | Hartford | 0
3 | Binghamton | 8

Final
1 | Stony Brook
3 | Binghamton

== All-Tournament Team ==
| Name | School |
|---|---|
| Scott Heath | Maine |
| Sean Newcomb | Hartford |
| David MacKinnon | Hartford |
| Joshua Mason | Stony Brook |
| Anthony Italiano | Stony Brook |
| Casey Baker | Stony Brook |
| Greg Ostner | Binghamton |
| Anthony Grillini | Binghamton |
| Eddie Posavec | Binghamton |
| Shaun McGraw | Binghamton |

=== Most Outstanding Player ===
Shaun McGraw was named Tournament Most Outstanding Player. McGraw was an infielder for Binghamton, who collected four hits in the championship game.
