= Venables =

Venables is an English surname of Norman–French origin, derived from the town of the same name in Normandy and introduced to England by way of the Norman Conquest.

== People ==
- Anthony Venables (born 1953), English economist
- Brent Venables (born 1970), American college football coach
- Clare Venables (1943–2003), British theatre director
- Daniel Venables (born 1998), Australian rules footballer
- Dione Venables (1930–2023), British publisher and author
- Edmund Venables (1819–1895), English cleric and antiquarian
- Gregory Venables (born 1949), English Anglican bishop
- Ian Venables (born 1955), British composer
- Jon Venables (born 1982), convicted British murderer
- Paul Venables (born 1962), British actor
- Phil Venables, British computer scientist and security specialist
- Philip Venables (born 1979), British composer
- Raissa Venables (born 1977), American photographer
- Robert Venables (c. 1613–1687), English soldier and writer
- Robert Venables Sr. (1933–2021), American politician
- Terry Venables (1943–2023), British football manager
- Stephen Venables (born 1954), British mountaineer and writer

== Places ==
- Venables, village in France

== See also ==
- Venable, surname
- Venables-Vernon, surname
