= 2015 America East Conference baseball tournament =

American college baseball tournament

- Teams: 4
- Format: Double-elimination
- Finals site: Edward A. LeLacheur Park; Lowell, Massachusetts
- Champions: Stony Brook (5th title)
- Winning coach: Matt Senk (5th title)
- MVP: Cameron Stone (Stony Brook)

2015 America East Conference baseball standings
	Conf.						Overall
Team	W		L		T	PCT	W		L		T	PCT
Stony Brook †‡^{y} ‍‍‍	18	–	4	–	1	.804	35	–	16	–	1	.683
UMBC ‍‍‍	14	–	10	–	0	.583	34	–	20	–	0	.630
Maine ‍‍‍	10	–	10	–	0	.500	24	–	28	–	0	.462
UMass Lowell * ‍‍‍	10	–	10	–	0	.500	17	–	26	–	0	.395
Hartford ‍‍‍	10	–	12	–	0	.455	23	–	31	–	0	.426
Albany ‍‍‍	7	–	13	–	0	.350	14	–	28	–	0	.333
Binghamton ‍‍‍	6	–	16	–	1	.283	17	–	24	–	2	.419
† – Conference champion ‡ – Tournament champion y – Invited to the NCAA tournament Ineligible for league and NCAA tournaments due to transition from Division II; As of June 30, 2015; Rankings from Collegiate Baseball

The 2015 America East Conference baseball tournament was held from May 21 through 23. The top four regular season finishers of the league's six eligible teams met in the double-elimination tournament to be held at Edward A. LeLacheur Park in Lowell, Massachusetts, the home park of UMass Lowell. Stony Brook claimed their fifth tournament championship and the Conference's automatic bid to the 2015 NCAA Division I baseball tournament.

== Seeding and format ==
The top four finishers from the regular season were seeded one through four based on conference winning percentage only. The teams played a double-elimination tournament. UMass Lowell, despite hosting the event, was not eligible to participate as it transitions from Division II. The River Hawks are expected to complete this transition and be eligible for championships in the 2017–18 academic year.

Team	W	L	T	Pct	GB	Seed
Stony Brook	18	4	1	.804	–	1
UMBC	14	10	0	.583	4.5	2
Maine	10	10	0	.500	7	3
UMass Lowell	10	10	0	.500	7	–
Hartford	10	12	0	.455	8.5	4
Albany	7	13	0	.350	10.5	–
Binghamton	6	16	1	.283	12	–

== Bracket ==
Upper round 1
1	Stony Brook	2
4	Hartford	0
2	UMBC	9
3	Maine	5
Lower round 1
4	Hartford	11
3	Maine	2

Upper final
1	Stony Brook	4
2	UMBC	3
Lower final
4	Hartford	2
2	UMBC	10

Final
1	Stony Brook
2	UMBC

== All-Tournament Team ==
The following players were named to the All-Tournament Team.

Name	School
Luke Morrill	Maine
Sam McKay	Hartford
Trey Stover	Hartford
Conrad Wozniak	UMBC
Jake Barnes	UMBC
Connor Hax	UMBC
Bobby Honeyman	Stony Brook
Daniel Zamora	Stony Brook
Robert Chavarria	Stony Brook
Cameron Stone	Stony Brook

=== Most Outstanding Player ===
Cameron Stone was named Tournament Most Outstanding Player. Stone, a sophomore pitcher for Stony Brook, recorded two saves in 4.1 perfect innings of work out of the Seawolves bullpen. He closed out all three wins for Stony Brook.
