= William Vernon Harcourt =

William Vernon Harcourt may refer to:

- William Vernon Harcourt (scientist) (1789–1871), father of the politician, and founder of the British Association for the Advancement of Science
- William Vernon Harcourt (politician) (1827–1904), son of the scientist, and Chancellor of the Exchequer
