= William W. Venable =

American politician (1880–1948)

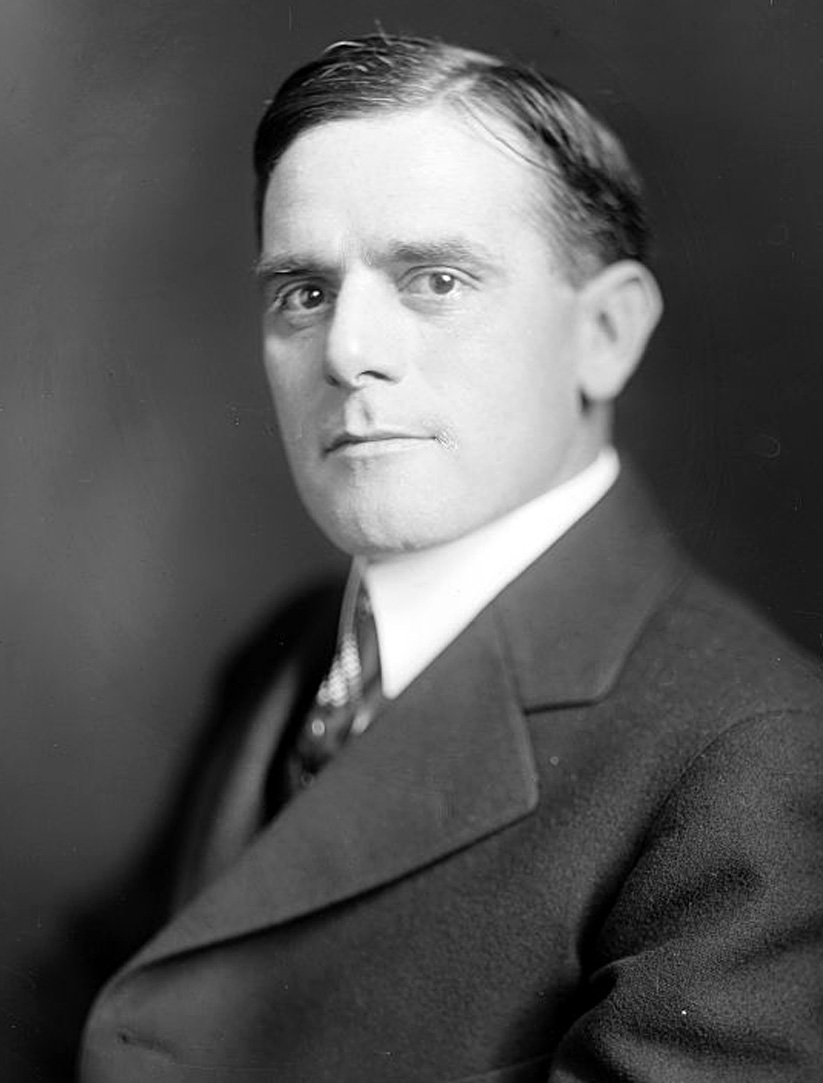

Member of the U.S. House of Representatives from Mississippi's 5th district
- In office January 4, 1916 – March 3, 1921
- Preceded by: Samuel A. Witherspoon
- Succeeded by: Ross A. Collins

Personal details
- Born: William Webb Venable; September 25, 1880 Clinton, Mississippi, U.S.
- Died: August 2, 1948 (aged 67) New Orleans, Louisiana, U.S.
- Resting place: Magnolia Cemetery, Meridian, Mississippi, U.S.
- Education: Mississippi College; University of Mississippi; Cumberland University
- Profession: Politician, lawyer

William Webb Venable (September 25, 1880 – August 2, 1948) was a U.S. representative from Mississippi.

Born in Clinton, Mississippi, Venable moved with his parents to Memphis, Tennessee, returned to Clinton, Mississippi, in 1891. He attended public and private schools. He was graduated from Mississippi College at Clinton in 1898, from the University of Mississippi at Oxford in 1899, and from the law department of Cumberland University, Lebanon, Tennessee, in 1905. He was admitted to the bar in 1905 and commenced practice in Meridian, Mississippi. He served as prosecuting attorney of Lauderdale County from April to October 1910, when he was appointed district attorney. He served in the latter capacity until January 1, 1915, when he resigned. He served as judge of the tenth judicial district of Mississippi from 1915 until his resignation in December 1916.

Venable was elected as a Democrat to the Sixty-fourth Congress to fill the vacancy caused by the death of Samuel A. Witherspoon. He was reelected to the Sixty-fifth and Sixty-sixth Congresses and served from January 4, 1916, to March 3, 1921. He was an unsuccessful for renomination. Practiced law Clarksdale, Mississippi. He died in New Orleans, Louisiana, August 2, 1948. He was interred in Magnolia Cemetery, Meridian, Mississippi.

U.S. House of Representatives
Preceded by Samuel A. Witherspoon	Member of the U.S. House of Representatives from Mississippi's 5th congressional district 1916–1921	Succeeded by Ross A. Collins
