= Alumni Field (MD) =

Baseball park in Catonsville, Maryland

- Alumni Field
- Interactive map of Alumni Field (MD)
- Former names: The Baseball Factory Field at UMBC
- Location: UMBC campus; 1000 Hilltop Circle, Catonsville, Maryland, USA
- Coordinates: 39.250145°N 76.708233°W
- Owner: University of Maryland, Baltimore County
- Operator: University of Maryland, Baltimore County
- Capacity: 1,000
- Scoreboard: Electronic

Construction
- Renovated: 2004

Tenant
- UMBC Retrievers baseball (NCAA Division I AEC)

Alumni Field is home to the UMBC Retrievers baseball team of the NCAA Division I America East Conference. The field is located adjacent to UMBC Stadium, and has a capacity of 1,000 spectators.

The venue had been renamed as The Baseball Factory Field at UMBC on April 20, 2004, after the university's agreement with player development company Baseball Factory. At the time the field underwent a $350,000 renovation which added a new lighting system, playing surface, and warning track, as well as upgrades to the facility's press box, dugout, and bleachers. In 2025 the venue reverted back to its original name, Alumni Field.

== See also ==
- List of NCAA Division I baseball venues
