= Harcourt (surname) =

Harcourt is a surname.

The surname Harcourt originated according to the geographical location, after the town of the same name in Normandy. This surname is 88,694th most common surname in the world, and it is held by approximately 1 in 1,346,056 people in the world, most in America.

Notable people with the surname include:

- Alfred Harcourt (1881–1954), American publisher
- Alison Harcourt (born 1929), Australian mathematician
- Augustus George Vernon Harcourt (1834–1919), English chemist
- Bernard Harcourt (born 1963), American researcher on crime and punishment
- Cecil Harcourt (1892–1959), British naval commander
- Cecil Harcourt Smith (1859–1944), British archaeologist and museum director
- Charles Harcourt (1838–1880), British actor
- Charlie Harcourt, songwriter and guitarist, particularly active in the 1970s; associated with Jackson Heights, Cat Mother & the All Night Newsboys and Lindisfarne.
- Ed Harcourt (born 1977), English singer-songwriter
- Edward Venables-Vernon-Harcourt (1757–1847), English clergyman
- Edward William Vernon Harcourt (1825–1891), English naturalist
- Geoffrey Harcourt (1931–2021), Australian economist
- George Harcourt (1785–1861), British politician
- Georgiana Harcourt (1807–1886), British translator
- Henry Harcourt (1873–1933), British politician
- Henry Harcourt (Jesuit) (1612–1673), English Jesuit
- James Harcourt (1873–1951), British actor
- Lewis Harcourt, 1st Viscount Harcourt (1863–1922), British politician, Secretary of State for the Colonies
- Mike Harcourt (born 1943), Canadian politician in British Columbia
- Nic Harcourt (born 1957), American radio station music director
- Octavius Vernon Harcourt (1793–1863), British naval officer
- Philip de Harcourt, 12th-century Lord Chancellor of England
- Richard Harcourt (1849–1932), Canadian judge and politician in Ontario
- Robert Harcourt (explorer) (1575–1631), British explorer of Guiana
- Robert Harcourt (unionist politician) (1902–1969), Northern Irish politician
- Robert Harcourt (Liberal politician) (1878–1962), British diplomat, playwright, and MP
- Simon Harcourt, 1st Viscount Harcourt (1661–1727), Lord Chancellor of Great Britain
- cSimon Harcourt, 1st Earl Harcourt (1714–1777), British diplomatist and general
- Thomas Harcourt, better known as Thomas Whitbread, (1618–1679), English Jesuit
- William Harcourt, 3rd Earl Harcourt (1743–1830), English nobleman and soldier
- William Harcourt (martyr) (1609–1679), English martyr
- William Vernon Harcourt (scientist) (1789–1871), founder of the British Association for the Advancement of Science
- William Harcourt (politician) (1827–1904), British Liberal statesman

== See also ==
- Vernon-Harcourt, surname
- House of Harcourt
