= Will Venable =

American baseball player, coach, & manager (born 1982)

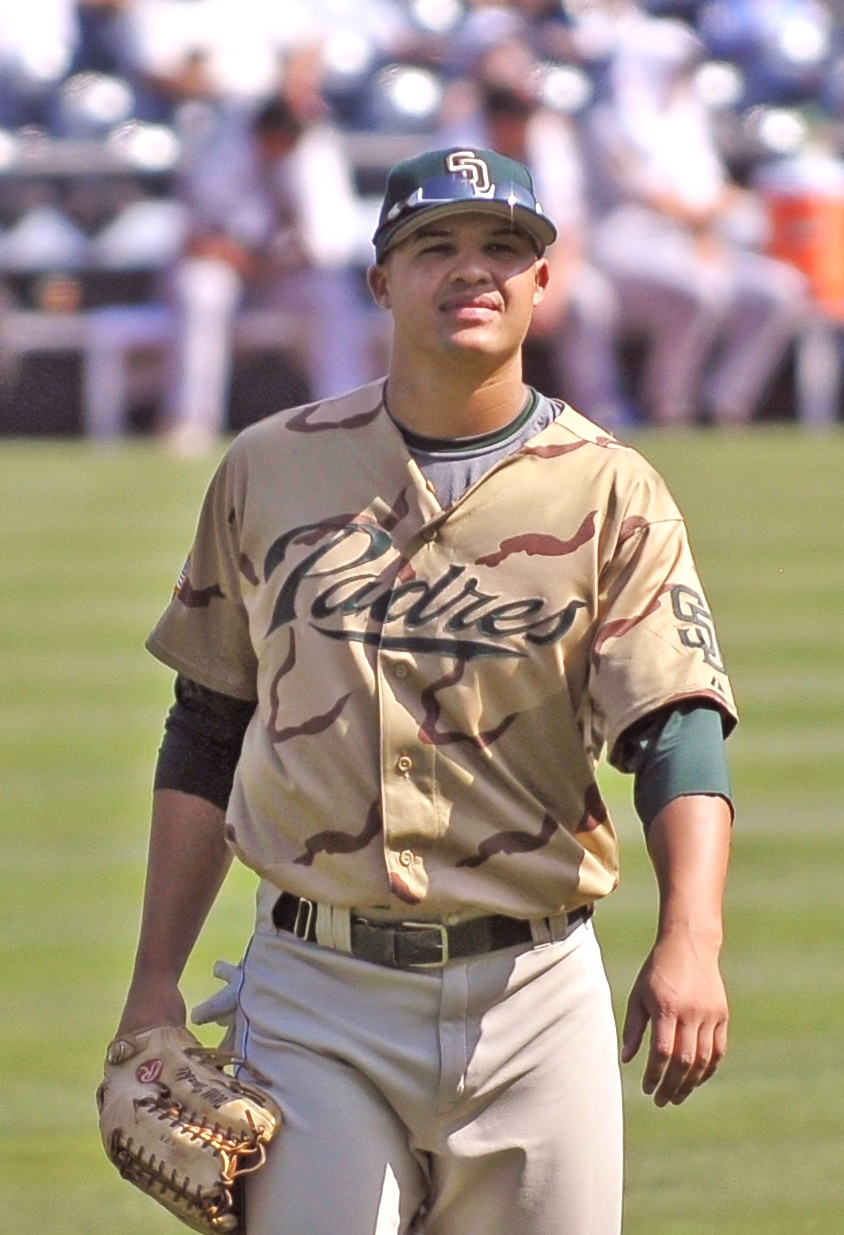
- Venable with the San Diego Padres in 2008

Chicago White Sox – No. 1
- Outfielder / Manager
- Born: October 29, 1982 (age 44); Greenbrae, California, U.S.
- Batted: Left Threw: Left

MLB debut
- August 29, 2008, for the San Diego Padres

Last MLB appearance
- July 6, 2016, for the Los Angeles Dodgers

MLB statistics (through 2026 season)
- Batting average: .249
- Home runs: 81
- Runs batted in: 307
- Managerial record: 144–180
- Winning %: .444
- Stats at Baseball Reference
- Managerial record at Baseball Reference

Teams
- As player: San Diego Padres (2008–2015); Texas Rangers (2015); Los Angeles Dodgers (2016); As manager: Chicago White Sox (2025–present); As coach: Chicago Cubs (2018–2020); Boston Red Sox (2021–2022); Texas Rangers (2023–2024)

Career highlights and awards
- World Series champion (2023); AL Manager of the Year (2026)

William Dion Venable (born October 29, 1982) is an American professional baseball manager and former outfielder and coach who is the manager of the Chicago White Sox of Major League Baseball (MLB). He played in MLB for the San Diego Padres, Texas Rangers, and Los Angeles Dodgers. He also was a coach for the Chicago Cubs, Boston Red Sox, and Texas Rangers. He is the son of former MLB outfielder Max Venable and is the older brother of former National Football League player Winston Venable.

Venable played college basketball for Princeton, where he was the second athlete to earn first-team All-Ivy League honors in both baseball and basketball. In the 2005 MLB draft, the Padres selected Venable in the seventh round; he made his major league debut in 2008. Although he broke into MLB as a center fielder, he played mostly as a right fielder after his second season. He finished among the top 10 in the National League in triples four times and in stolen bases twice. He has the most MLB career hits and home runs of any Princeton alumnus.

== Early life and amateur career ==
Venable was born in 1982 in Greenbrae near San Rafael, California, while his father Max Venable was an MLB player for the nearby San Francisco Giants. Venable grew up traveling around the country with his father, and also lived in Japan and the Dominican Republic.

=== High school ===
In high school, Venable envisioned himself as more likely to be a professional basketball player than baseball player. Prior to his freshman year, his mother, Molly, objected to him quitting baseball to focus on basketball. As both a high school sophomore and a high school junior, Venable was second-team San Francisco Bay Area All-Metro basketball player for San Rafael High School. He was the Marin County Athletic League (MCAL) most valuable player in basketball as a freshman, sophomore and junior. As a sophomore, he led his team to the MCAL League Championship. As a senior, he gave up the responsibility of being point forward.

=== College career ===
Venable chose to attend Princeton University not for its academics but for its tradition of basketball excellence. He respected its tradition of qualifying to participate in the NCAA Men's Division I Basketball Championship Tournament. He was a member of teams that qualified for two postseason tournaments, the 2002 National Invitation Tournament and the 2004 NCAA Men's Division I Basketball Tournament. Princeton recruited him as a basketball player. He did not play baseball as a freshman, but his father had directed him to Scott Bradley, Princeton's baseball coach, during his recruiting visit.

Venable was the second athlete in Ivy League history to be first-team All-Ivy in both basketball and baseball, after fellow Princeton alum and future San Diego Padres teammate and Texas Rangers co-worker Chris Young. Venable played on Ivy League Champion National Collegiate Athletic Association (NCAA) Championship tournament teams in both sports. He played in two postseason tournaments in both sports and earned a B.A. in anthropology, graduating in 2005.

In basketball, he averaged over 10 points and over 30 minutes per game in his 2002–03 sophomore season through his 2004–05 senior season.

Bradley had left the door open for Venable to take batting practice if he ever had the urge. As a sophomore, at his mother's suggestion, Venable resumed baseball. He posted modest numbers in his first season, but in 2004, he hit for a .344 batting average, earned All-Ivy honorable mention, and was drafted by the Baltimore Orioles in the 15th round of the draft (439th overall). Bradley felt that Major League Baseball scouts undervalued Venable because he did not participate in the Cape Cod League for college baseball players. So instead of signing and giving up his amateur status, Venable returned for his senior season. He posted a league-leading nine home runs and second-best .385 batting average while earning All-League honors. Subsequently, the Padres drafted him in the seventh round (215th overall). He was signed by the Padres' Northeast Scouting Director, Jim Bretz.

== Professional career ==
=== Minor League Baseball ===
Venable made his professional debut in minor league baseball with the Arizona League Padres in 2005. He hit for a .322 batting average in 15 games and was soon promoted to the Eugene Emeralds of the Single-A Northwest League.

In 2006, Venable was the Padres Minor League Player of the Year. With his father as a team hitting coach, Venable posted a .314 batting average, .389 on-base percentage (OBP), and .477 slugging percentage for the Fort Wayne Wizards of the Single-A Midwest League (MWL), which earned him both mid-season and post-season MWL All-Star honors. He tied for the MWL lead in runs scored and was among the top four Padre farmhands in RBIs, batting average, and stolen bases. Among his highlights for the Wizards were his team-high two grand slams and a five-hit game.

Subsequently, for the 2006 West Oahu CaneFires of the Hawaii Winter Baseball, Venable posted a .330 batting average, .390 on-base percentage (OBP), and .473 slugging percentage. He won the batting title that season and was named league most valuable player. He also led the league in doubles and was second to John Otness in OBP. Before the 2007 season, Venable was listed as the fifth best prospect in the Padres organization by Baseball America, and they named him the #11 prospect in the league. They also named him as a Baseball America Low-A All-Star.

In 2007, Venable batted .278 with a .337 OBP in 134 games for the San Antonio Missions of the Texas League. This again earned him both mid-season and post-season league All-Star honors. On May 30, he hit for the cycle. After the season ended, he was invited to play for the San Diego affiliate in the Arizona Fall League, but he was afflicted with tendinitis in his shoulder and only hit .228.

During 2008 spring training, he had two home runs and eight runs batted in his first 12 at-bats. He then posted a .292 batting average, .361 on-base percentage and .464 slugging percentage in 120 games for the Portland Beavers of the Pacific Coast League in 2008.

=== San Diego Padres ===
==== 2008–2011 ====
Venable had been expected to be a September 2008 call-up, but when Scott Hairston was forced onto the disabled list, Venable was called up ahead of schedule. On August 29, 2008, in his debut, he tripled in his first at-bat and came around to score a run. He was the 25th Princeton graduate to play in the Major Leagues, the first of them who was African-American. In his sixth game, he hit his first MLB home run, on September 4 in a 5–2 victory over the Milwaukee Brewers. His only other home run in 2008 was also in a road victory on September 19, in an 11–6 victory over the Washington Nationals. During this game, Venable had his first three-hit performance and first three-RBI performance. When Venable batted leadoff for the Padres on September 28, against Pittsburgh, he became the first Princeton batter to oppose a Princeton pitcher, Ross Ohlendorf. In 2008, Venable accumulated only 110 Major League at-bats, preserving his rookie eligibility. He only played centerfield for the Padres in 2008. After the MLB season, he played winter baseball in the Dominican Professional Baseball League, where he struggled.

Although in 2008 Baseball America projected Venable as an every day starter for the Padres in 2010, some experts questioned whether he would be a long-term solution in center field for the team. Venable started the 2009 season with the Triple-A Portland Beavers, but he was recalled by the Padres on June 3. His father, Max, served as the Beavers' hitting coach in 2009. Following the July 5 trade of Scott Hairston to the Oakland Athletics, Venable shared right field with Kyle Blanks. On July 12 against the San Francisco Giants, he had his first home run of the season in his first career four-hit game. Between July 30 and August 5, he homered in five of seven games. On August 23 against the St. Louis Cardinals, he was involved in a bench-clearing incident when Albert Pujols thought he threw an elbow while being tagged out. In 2009, Venable hit 12 home runs and tallied 38 runs batted in (RBI), while primarily playing right field defensively, with some action in center field.

In 2010, he finished 8th in the National League with 7 triples and 9th with 29 stolen bases. He executed some delayed steals by taking off with the toss back to the mound "when neither infielder is covering second and the catcher is nonchalant with the ball after receiving the pitch." On May 19, Venable moved into the leadoff position in the lineup, and he fell a home run shy of the franchise's first cycle against the Los Angeles Dodgers, going 4-for-5 at the plate after getting a triple in the 1st inning and a double in the third. On June 23, 25 and 27, Venable hit tie-breaking home runs in Padre victories against the Florida Marlins and Tampa Bay Rays. On July 3, he went on the 15-day disabled list due to back problems. On September 29 against the Chicago Cubs, he robbed two potential home runs, from Alfonso Soriano and Aramis Ramírez, on deep fly balls. In the game, he achieved his career-high 10-game hitting streak. He also led National League outfielders with 5 errors. He set new career-highs with 13 home runs and 51 RBI. Again, he was primarily a right fielder, also spending some time in left field and center field.

In 2011, Venable started slowly, hitting only .205 in April and was eventually optioned to the Triple-A Tucson Padres on May 23 before being recalled on June 9. At the time of his demotion, he had no home runs and a .224 batting average in 134 at-bats. He was recalled after going 16-for-58 with three doubles, three triples, three home runs and three stolen bases in 14 games. In a minor league game on May 27, he homered twice against the Salt Lake Bees. On July 20, Venable scored three runs in the first two innings as the Padres jumped out to a 13–0 lead against the Florida Marlins. In late July, he missed a few games due to back spasms. On August 10 against the New York Mets, Venable had four hits, again missing the cycle by a home run when he posted a second double in a ninth inning at bat. On August 21, Venable delivered a leadoff home run and the game-winning bases-loaded walk-off hit on Trevor Hoffman Day. On September 28, he got his first grand slam home run against the Chicago Cubs off of Ryan Dempster. For the season, his totals dropped to 9 home runs and 44 RBI with the Padres, and he again totaled 7 triples, this time finishing 10th in the league. He again played mostly in right field.

==== 2012–2015 ====
In 2012, Venable and Chris Denorfia formed a platoon in right field, with Venable getting most of the starts against right-handed pitchers and batting .270 against them. Venable made 80 starts in right, appearing in a then-career-high 148 games for the year. When not starting in right, he made occasional starts in center and left field and pinch hit 26 time. On May 15, Venable had a single, double and triple by the fourth inning against the Washington Nationals, but his 4-hit effort again fell short of the cycle. On May 23, Venable had his sixth career leadoff home run and added a single in the second inning and a double in the fourth against the St. Louis Cardinals. He ended up one hit shy of the cycle for the fifth time, this time lacking a triple. On June 3, Venable suffered a strained oblique muscle and left the game, missing four more games with the injury. Venable finished the year batting .264 with 9 home runs and 45 RBI. He collected 8 triples, finishing 9th in the league, and also committed 7 errors, tied for first among NL outfielders.

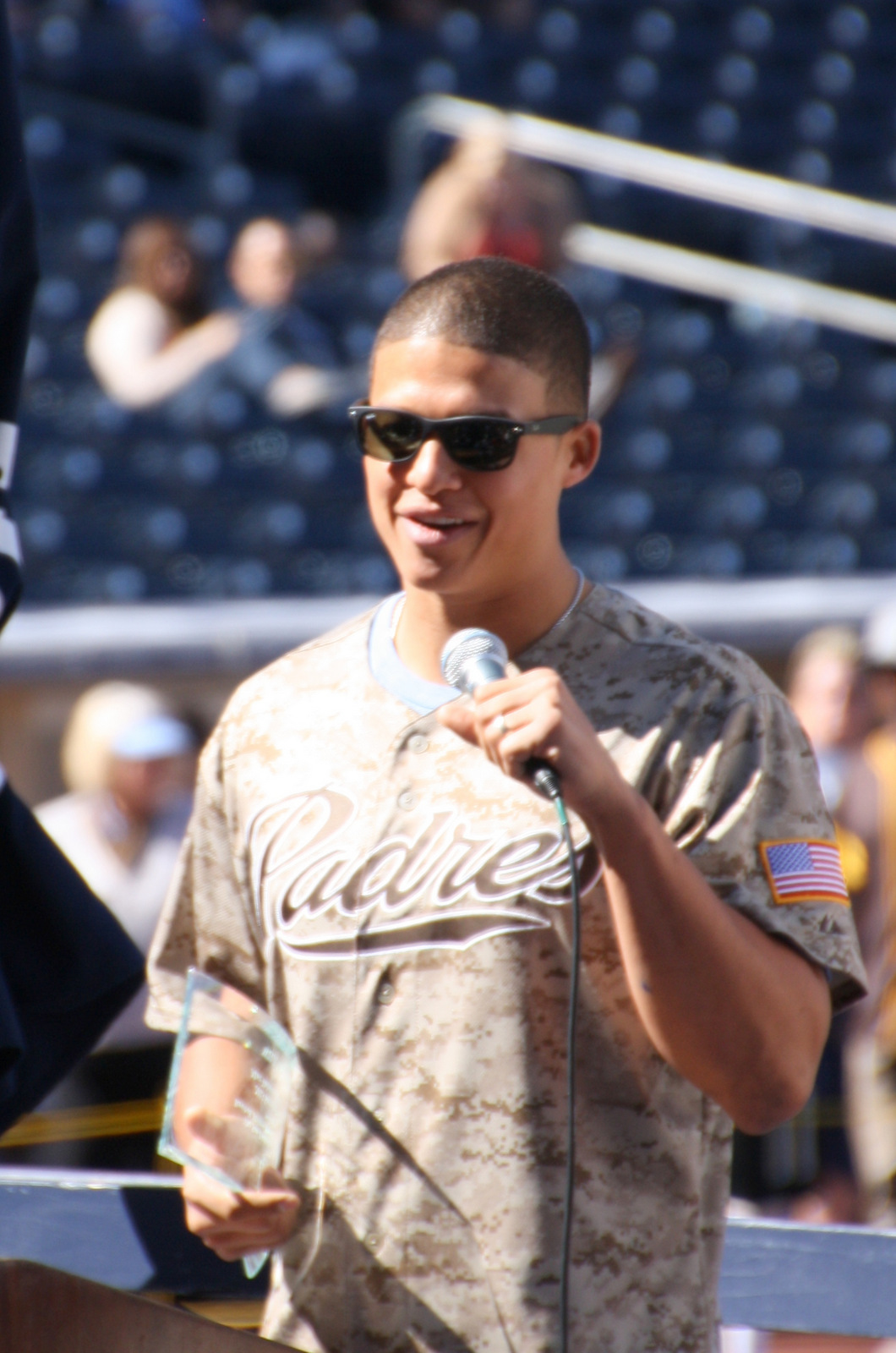
Venable with 2013 Padres Most Valuable Player award

Coming into 2013, Venable was again expected to platoon with Denorfia in right, but injuries to center fielder Cameron Maybin and left fielder Carlos Quentin expanded his playing time. He made 68 starts in right and 52 in center and played in a career-high 151 games. Venable entered the season with 401 career hits, 48 shy of Moe Berg's record for the most hits by a Princeton player. Venable's 46 home runs were already a school best. Venable won the National League Player of the Week Award for the week of August 12–18. During the week, Venable tied his single-game career high with four hits, joined the Padres' 100-steal club, hit a walk-off home run, robbed a home run, and surpassed his previous career best hitting streak by five to 15. It marked his first Player of the Week Award, as he hit .406 (13-for-32) with two home runs, two doubles, a triple and seven runs scored. On September 13, David Hale, who graduated from Princeton in 2011, made his major league debut for the Atlanta Braves, and it became the second Princeton vs. Princeton batter-pitcher matchup in major league history. Hale struck out Venable and eight other Padres in his debut for the Braves, setting a franchise debut record. Venable was voted the Padres' Most Valuable Player for the 2013 season by local baseball writers and other media members as he became the 8th player in Padres history to record at least 20 home runs and 20 steals in a season. For the year, Venable hit .268 with 22 home runs and a .796 on-base plus slugging, all new career highs. He also stole 22 bases and finished tied for fifth in the league with 8 triples.

On September 2, 2013, Venable signed a two-year contract extension with the Padres to keep him in San Diego through the 2015 season. Venable batted .224 with eight home runs in the 2014 season. His batting average, .288 on-base percentage, .325 slugging percentage, and 38 RBIs were all career lows for a full season. During the 2014–15 offseason, the Padres acquired outfielders Matt Kemp, Justin Upton, and Wil Myers, shifting Venable into a reserve role. For the Padres in 2015, Venable hit .258 with six home runs, 10 doubles, and 11 stolen bases through mid-August.

=== Texas Rangers ===
On August 18, 2015, the Padres traded Venable to the Texas Rangers for catcher Marcus Greene and a player to be named later. On August 21, the Rangers sent Jon Edwards to the Padres to complete the trade, after Edwards cleared waivers and could be traded. The Rangers needed another outfielder to supplement players like Josh Hamilton, who had dealt with injuries in the past. Venable was not a benefit to the Rangers, batting .182 with three doubles as his only extra base hits in 82 plate appearances.

=== Philadelphia Phillies ===
On February 28, 2016, Venable signed a minor league contract with the Cleveland Indians. On March 27, Cleveland released him. The next day, Venable signed a minor league contract with the Philadelphia Phillies. On June 11, Venable opted out of his minor league deal with the Phillies and became a free agent.

=== Los Angeles Dodgers ===
On June 14, 2016, the Los Angeles Dodgers signed Venable and added him to their major league roster. He appeared in six games for the Dodgers and had one hit (a double) in 10 at-bats before he was designated for assignment on June 24. He cleared waivers and accepted an outright assignment to the Triple-A Oklahoma City Dodgers the next day. On July 1, the Dodgers brought Venable back to the active roster when Joc Pederson was placed on the disabled list. On July 7, he was again designated for assignment, and on July 11, he again accepted an outright assignment to Oklahoma City. He had one hit in 19 at-bats for Los Angeles and played in 46 games for Oklahoma City, where he hit .276/.343/.404 with four home runs and 25 RBI. Venable elected free agency following the season on November 7.

== Coaching and managerial career ==
=== Coaching career ===
==== Chicago Cubs ====
On September 6, 2017, Venable was named a special assistant to Chicago Cubs president Theo Epstein. Venable served as the first base coach of the Cubs in 2018 and 2019. For the 2020 season, he became the Cubs third base coach.

==== Boston Red Sox ====
On November 20, 2020, the Boston Red Sox named Venable their bench coach. On May 29, 2021, Venable managed his first MLB game, filling in for Alex Cora in a game against the Miami Marlins, as Cora was in Puerto Rico to attend the high school graduation of one of his children. The Red Sox won, 3–1. On November 16, 2022, Venable was hired by the Texas Rangers to be an associate manager alongside Bruce Bochy.

=== Managerial career ===
==== Chicago White Sox ====
On October 31, 2024, the Chicago White Sox hired Venable to be their manager following the firing of Pedro Grifol during their 41–121 season, which broke the MLB record for most losses in a season. Venable replaced interim manager Grady Sizemore.

In 2026, Venable led the White Sox to the playoffs, also winning AL manager of the year.

== Managerial record ==
As of October 10, 2026

Team	Year	Regular season					Postseason			
Team	Year	Games	Won	Lost	Win %	Finish	Won	Lost	Win %	Result
CWS	2025	162	60	102	.370	5th in AL Central	–	–	–	–
CWS	2026	162	84	78	.519	2nd in AL Central	4	3	.571	Lost ALDS (CLE)
Total		324	144	180	.444		4	3	.571	

== See also ==
- List of Chicago White Sox award winners and league leaders
- List of second-generation Major League Baseball players

Sporting positions
Preceded by Brandon Hyde	Chicago Cubs first base coach 2018–2019	Succeeded by Craig Driver
Preceded by Brian Butterfield	Chicago Cubs third base coach 2020	Succeeded by Willie Harris
Preceded by Jerry Narron	Boston Red Sox bench coach 2021–2022	Succeeded by Ramón Vázquez
