= William Henry Venable =

American author and educator

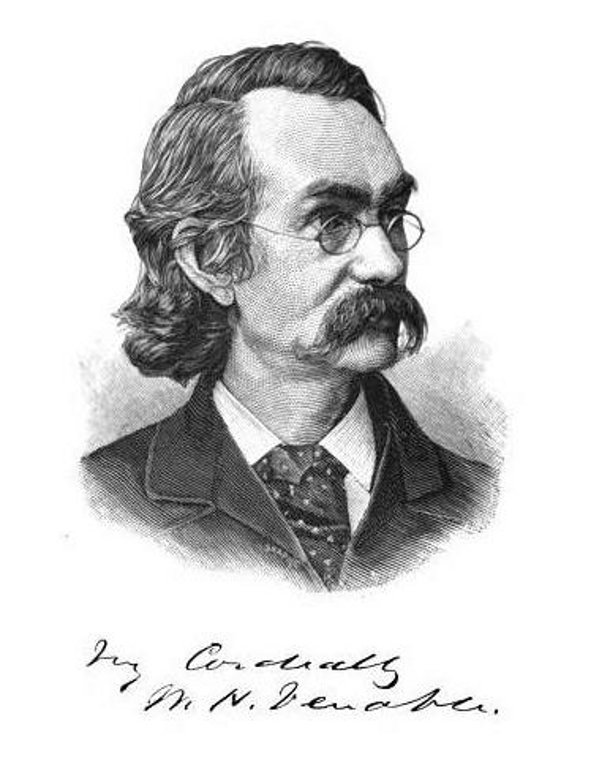
- Venable in 1890
- Born: April 29, 1836; Warren County, Ohio, United States
- Died: 1920 (aged 83–84); Cincinnati, Ohio, United States
- Occupations: Author, English teacher
- Children: Emerson Venable
- Writing career
- Genres: Literature, Poetry

William Henry Venable (April 29, 1836 – 1920) was an American author and educator.

== Biography ==
He was born in Warren County, Ohio. He began to teach at seventeen years of age, and during his vacations attended teachers' institutes in Oxford, Ohio, being one of the first teachers in the state upon whom the Ohio board of examiners conferred a life certificate. He was graduated at the National Normal University at Lebanon, Ohio, and in 1862, became professor of natural science in Chickering Classical and Scientific Institute, Cincinnati, Ohio, in the same year, was its principal and proprietor in 1881, organized and was first president of the Cincinnati Society of Political Education, and in 1882 founded and conducted in that city the African School of Popular Science and History.

Beginning in 1886, he spent three years on literary work and lecturing. He was an editor of the Ohio Archaeological and Historical Quarterly. He was actively connected with many educational associations, and a member of several learned bodies. The Ohio University gave him the degree of LL.D. in 1886. In 1889 he became Chairman of the English Department at Hughes High School in Cincinnati and in 1896 became chairman of the same department at Walnut Hills High School, also in Cincinnati. While holding these positions he was an active proponent of education reform.

== Descendants ==
His son Emerson Venable also taught English at Walnut Hills. His granddaughter Evelyn Venable attended Walnut Hills and went on to become a noted actress.

== Notable works ==
He published 22 books, including:

- "June on the Miami, and other Poems" (Cincinnati, 1871)
- "A School History of the United States" (1872)
- "The School Stage, 's a collection of juvenile acting plays, original and adapted (1873)
- "The Teacher's Dream," a poem (New York, 1880)
- "Melodies of the Heart, and other Poems" (Cincinnati, 1884)
- "Melodies of the heart, songs of freedom, and other poems" (1885);
- "Footprints of the Pioneers in the Ohio Valley" (1888)
- "Biography of William D. Gallagher" (1888)
- "Historical Sketch of Western Periodical Literature" (1888)
- "Early periodical literature of the Ohio Valley" (1888)
- "Down South before the war" (1889)
- "Beginnings of literary culture in the Ohio valley, historical and biographical sketches" (1891)
- "Let him first be a man, and other essays chiefly relating to education and culture" (1893)
- "Saga of the oak, and other poems" (1904)
- "Dream of empire, or, The house of Blennerhassett" (1901)
- "Floridian sonnets" (1909)
- "Buckeye boyhood" (1911)

He also published several pamphlets, addresses, etc., and edited "The Dramatic Actor," a collection of plays (1873) and "Dramatic Scenes from the Best Authors" (1874).
