= Max Venable =

American baseball player (born 1957)

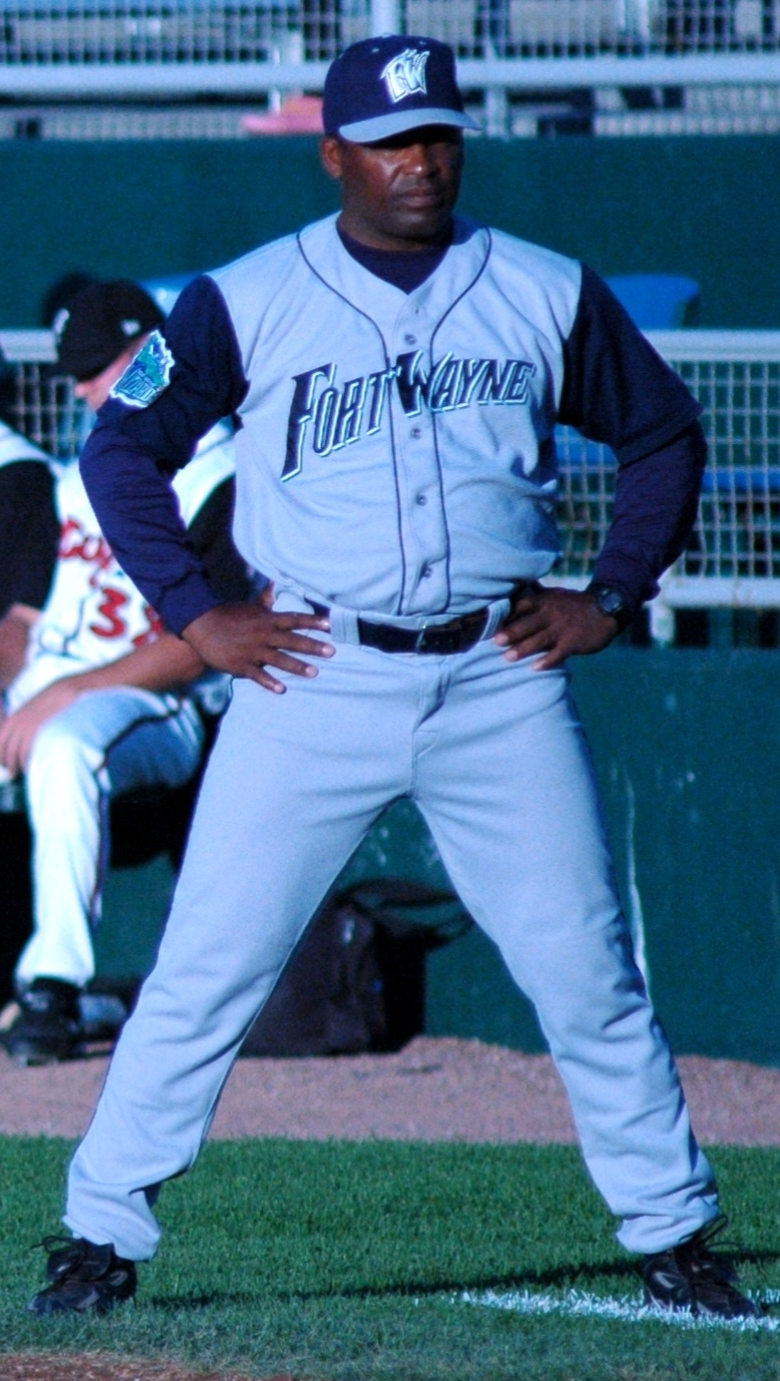
- Outfielder
- Born: June 6, 1957 (age 69); Phoenix, Arizona, U.S.
- Batted: Left Threw: Right

MLB debut
- April 8, 1979, for the San Francisco Giants

Last MLB appearance
- October 6, 1991, for the California Angels

MLB statistics
- Batting average: .241
- Home runs: 18
- Runs batted in: 128
- Stats at Baseball Reference

Teams
- San Francisco Giants (1979–1983); Montreal Expos (1984); Cincinnati Reds (1985–1987); California Angels (1989–1991); Chiba Lotte Marines (1992–1993)

William McKinley "Max" Venable (born June 6, 1957) is an American former professional baseball outfielder and designated hitter. He played 12 seasons in Major League Baseball (MLB) for the San Francisco Giants, Montreal Expos, Cincinnati Reds, and California Angels. Venable also played for the Chiba Lotte Marines of Nippon Professional Baseball (NPB), and coached for the SK Wyverns of the KBO League.

== Early years ==
Venable is the son of Jean and Max Venable. He went to Cordova High School in Rancho Cordova, California, where he was a multi-sport star. He excelled in all sports but, in high school, football was his best. He turned down football scholarships to sign with the Los Angeles Dodgers.

== Career ==
=== Major League Baseball ===
Although drafted by the Los Angeles Dodgers in the 3rd round of the 1976 amateur draft, the Dodgers left him unprotected. In 1978 the San Francisco Giants took Venable in the Rule 5 draft. The Giants traded him to the Montreal Expos in 1984. Venable later played for the Cincinnati Reds, of the National League, and the California Angels of the American League. He also played two seasons in Japan, 1992 and 1993, for the Chiba Lotte Marines.

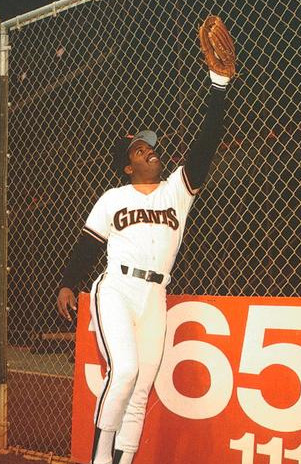
Venable with the San Francisco Giants

He coached for the Atlanta Braves in the minor leagues, along with the San Diego Padres. He is a hitting instructor in the Seattle Mariners farm system to date.

=== SK Wyverns ===
Max signed with Korean Baseball team SK Wyverns as a hitting coach in 2013.

== Personal life ==
Max married Mary “Molly” Cross in May 1982. The couple have two sons. Max's older son, Will, is a former Major League outfielder and current manager for the Chicago White Sox. Will previously played baseball and basketball for Princeton University. He joined his father as a member of the Portland Beavers in 2008. Max's younger son Winston Venable is a former National Football League player for the Chicago Bears and in college was a standout safety for the Boise State Broncos football team for the 2009–10 and 2010–11 seasons.
