= Fiondella Field =

Baseball venue in West Hartford, Connecticut

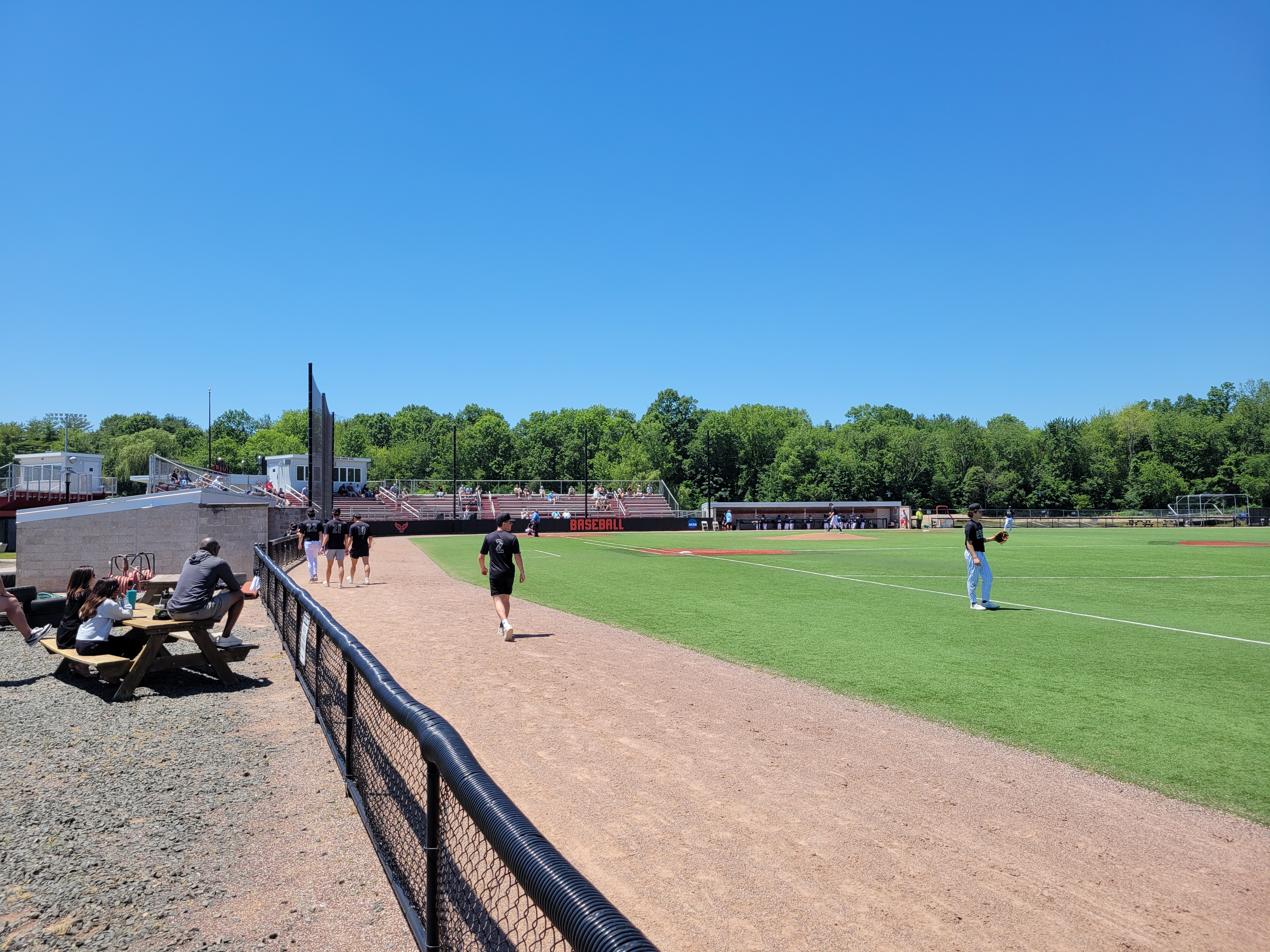
- Interactive map of Fiondella Field
- Former names: Hartford Baseball Field (2006-09)
- Location: Hawk Drive, Hartford, Connecticut, USA
- Coordinates: 41.804258°N 72.715386°W
- Owner: University of Hartford
- Operator: University of Hartford
- Capacity: 1,000
- Surface: FieldTurf
- Scoreboard: Electronic
- Field size: Left field: 325 feet (99 m); Left center field: 370 feet (110 m); Center field: 400 feet (120 m); Right center field: 370 feet (110 m); Right field: 325 feet (99 m)

Construction
- Built: 2006
- Opened: March 29, 2006

Tenant
- Hartford Hawks (NCAA) (2006–present)

Fiondella Field is a college baseball stadium in Hartford, Connecticut, U.S., on the campus of the University of Hartford. It is home to the Hartford Hawks, of the Conference of New England. The stadium hosted its first game on March 29, 2006. It has a capacity of 1,000.

== History ==
Prior to the field's construction, Hartford's baseball program played at several venues in central Connecticut following its move off campus in the mid-1980s. These venues included New Britain's Beehive Field, Bristol's Muzzy Field, East Hartford's Ray McKenna Field, and Simsbury's Memorial Field.

Ground was broken on the venue in April 2005. The venue opened on March 29, 2006, and Hartford's first game there was against Massachusetts. Hartford won the game, 6–2.

=== Renaming ===
Through the 2009 season, the field was known as the Hartford Baseball Field. In a ceremony on October 4, 2009, the venue was renamed Fiondella Field, in honor of the Fiondella family, primarily businessman Robert Fiondella, because of his involvement in the Hartford community.

=== High school baseball ===
The West Hartford amateur baseball association sponsors the annual mayor's cup baseball game at Fiondella Field. It is the final game of season between rivals Conard High School and Hall High School.

== See also ==
- List of NCAA Division I baseball venues
