= UMBC Retrievers baseball =

College baseball team in Maryland, US

UMBC Retrievers
- 2026 UMBC Retrievers baseball team
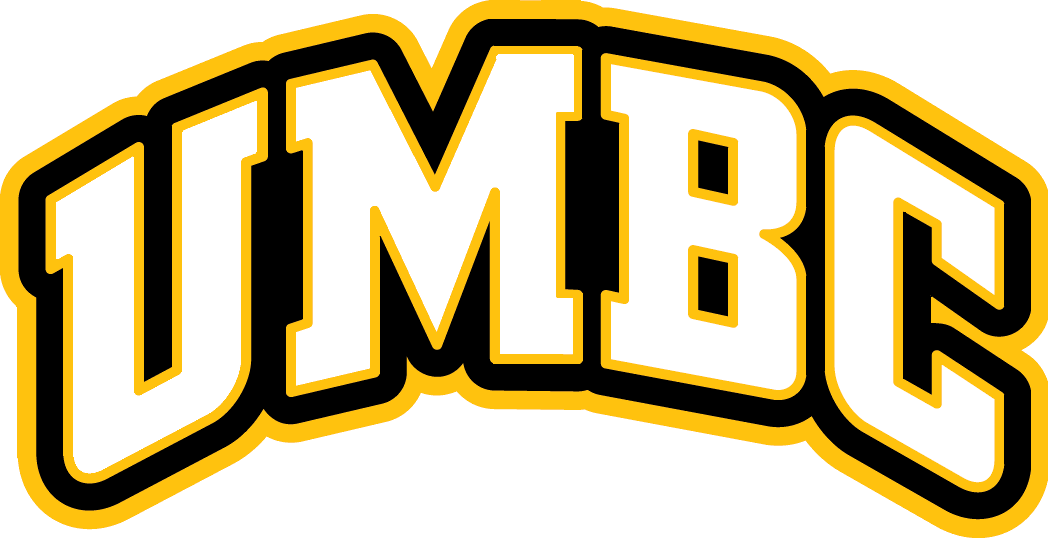
- Founded: 1967; 59 years ago
- University: University of Maryland, Baltimore County
- Head coach: Dave Gage (1st season)
- Conference: America East
- Location: Baltimore, Maryland
- Home stadium: Alumni Field (MD) (capacity: 1,000)
- Nickname: Retrievers
- Colors: Black and gold

NCAA tournament appearances
- 1992, 2001, 2017

Conference tournament champions
- NEC: 2001; AEC: 2017

UMBC Retrievers baseball is the varsity intercollegiate team representing University of Maryland, Baltimore County in the sport of college baseball at the Division I level of the National Collegiate Athletic Association (NCAA). The team is led by Dave Gage, and plays its home games at Alumni Field (MD) on campus in Baltimore, Maryland. The Retrievers are members of the America East Conference.

== NCAA Tournament results ==
UMBC has appeared in the NCAA Division I baseball tournament three times. They have a record of 0–6.

Year	Region	Opponent	Result
1992	Atlantic Regional	Miami; Delaware	L 1–3; L 5–6
2001	Wilson Regional	East Carolina; Winthrop	L 0–7; L 0–6
2017	Winston-Salem Regional	Wake Forest; Maryland	L 3–11; L 2–16
