= Dunkin' Park =

Baseball stadium in Hartford, Connecticut

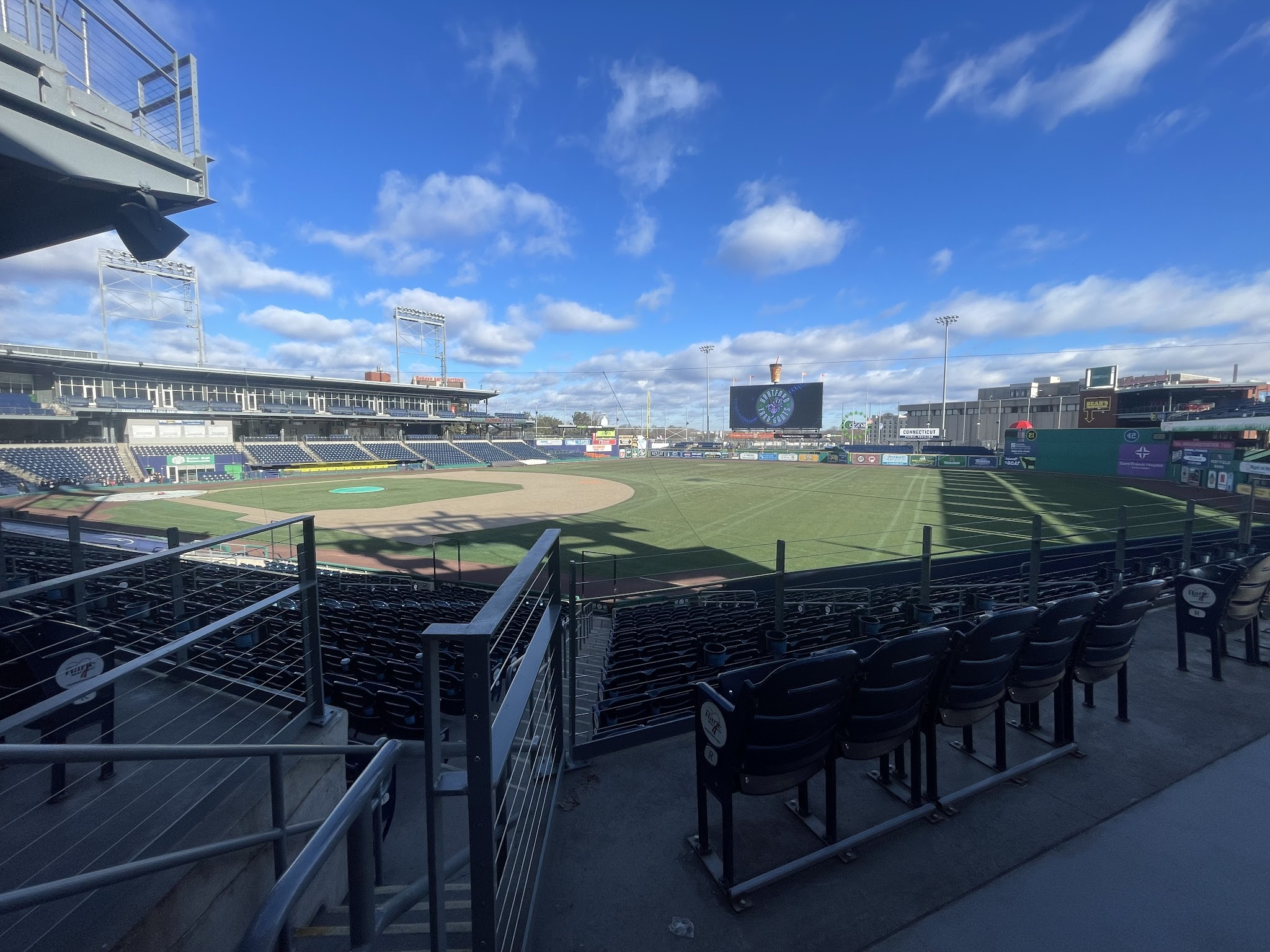

- Location within Connecticut Location within the United States
- Interactive map of Dunkin' Park
- Former names: Dunkin' Donuts Park (2017–2022)
- Address: 1214 Main Street; Hartford, Connecticut
- Coordinates: 41°46′17″N 72°40′26″W
- Owner: City of Hartford
- Operator: Hartford Stadium Authority
- Capacity: 6,121
- Surface: Grass
- Record attendance: 6,850 (April 13, 2017)
- Field size: Left Field: 325 feet (99 m); Left Center: 357 feet (109 m); Center Field: 400 feet (120 m); Right Center: 350 feet (110 m); Right Field: 308 feet (94 m)
- Public transit: 40, 42, 44, 46, 50, 52, 54, 56, 58, Dash

Construction
- Groundbreaking: February 17, 2015
- Opened: April 11, 2017
- Cost: $56 million (approx.)
- Architects: Pendulum Studio; The S/L/A/M Collaborative; Newman Architects
- Project managers: International Facilities Group, LLC
- Services engineers: BVH Integrated Services, PC
- General contractors: Centerplan Construction Company; Whiting-Turner

Tenants
- Hartford Yard Goats (EL) (2017–present); Hartford Hawks baseball (NCAA) (select games); UConn Huskies baseball (NCAA) (select games)

Dunkin' Park is a 6,121-seat baseball park in Hartford, Connecticut. It is the home field of the Hartford Yard Goats of the Eastern League. The stadium has a total capacity of 6,850 people, including standing room, which was reached numerous times during its inaugural season of 2017. It was planned to open for the 2016 season on April 7, but numerous construction delays postponed the venue's opening and forced the Yard Goats to play the entire season on the road. The stadium opened in time for the team's 2017 home opener on April 13.

Dunkin' purchased the naming rights for the stadium for an undisclosed amount. The stadium initially maintained the Dunkin' Donuts name and branding after the company rebranded as Dunkin'. The ballpark was supposed to be part of a larger $400 million redevelopment plan called Downtown North (DoNo). DoNo would have included a 50,000-square-foot (4,600 m^{2}) supermarket, the relocated Thomas Hooker Brewing Company, housing, retail, and restaurants. In December 2015, it was also announced that the development would include the first Hard Rock Hotel in New England. These plans were eventually scrapped. Dunkin' Park was voted as Ballpark Digest's best minor league ballpark among Double-A facilities in both 2017 and 2018.

== Construction delays ==
In December 2015, it was reported that the project was $10 million over budget and the park might not be ready for opening day on April 7, 2016. In January 2016, it was confirmed that the Hartford Yard Goats would play their first month of the season on the road because the developers and the City of Hartford could not reach an agreement on how to solve the budget shortfall and finish construction on time.

Owing to numerous additional delays during the winter and spring of 2016, new target dates, at first May 17 and later May 31, were set as Opening Day for the Yard Goats at Dunkin' Park, but work again was not complete on the ballpark in time for the team to move in. Yard Goats home games between May 17 and June 5 were moved to Dodd Stadium in Norwich, Connecticut, a 45-minute drive southeast of Hartford. The Yard Goats returned to playing all games on the road in mid-June, when Dodd Stadium's primary tenant, the Connecticut Tigers of the New York-Penn League, began their season. Hartford's home series scheduled for June 14–16 was moved to the visiting team's ballpark in Reading, Pennsylvania, home of the Reading Fightin Phils. Later, it was announced the Yard Goats' first game in the new park would be on June 21.

On June 6, 2016, the city terminated its contract with developer Centerplan, after Centerplan estimated that it could be another 60 days before the ballpark is complete. With no developer or contractor, the club began the process of moving games to alternate locations for games in July and August; some games were scheduled to be played on the road, with others moved to neutral sites.

In July, it was announced that the entire 2016 season would be played on the road and that the owners might relocate the franchise if Hartford did not complete the stadium in time for 2017. After the city called an insurance bond with Arch Insurance, the firm hired Whiting-Turner to complete construction. Work resumed in October 2016, and the new developer completed the ballpark to be ready for the team's 2017 home opener on April 13.

The original developers sued the City of Hartford over their terminated contract, seeking $90 million in damages. In July 2019 a jury ruled against the contractor, awarding the city $335,000.

== Opening ==
Following the completion of the park, it was announced the Yard Goats' 2017 home opener on April 13 against the New Hampshire Fisher Cats would be the first game in the new stadium. Tickets for Opening Night sold out within 30 minutes of sales being open to the general public. However, it was later announced that the stadium would have a "soft launch" on April 11 for a college baseball game between Quinnipiac and the University of Hartford Hawks. Hartford defeated Quinnipiac 6–4 before a crowd of 2,910 fans. Two days later, New Hampshire defeated the Yard Goats 7–2 to officially open the ballpark.

The exterior of Dunkin' Park in 2026

== Other uses ==
=== College baseball ===
On May 18, 2017, UConn baseball played their first game at Dunkin' Park, defeating East Carolina 6–0. The Hartford Hawks and UConn Baseball used the venue for four home games each in 2018, with UConn appearing five times (once as Hartford's guest). In 2019, UConn scheduled four home games at the park and Hartford scheduled three, with the Central Connecticut State University Blue Devils being one of the Hawks' opponents. In 2023, Dunkin Park hosted six collegiate baseball games, including UConn against UMBC, Central Connecticut, and Yale. Some other matchups included Yale against Hartford, Saint Joseph against Westfield State, and Central Connecticut versus Quinnipiac.

=== Cape Cod Baseball League ===
The Cape Cod Baseball League played their first game in Connecticut when the Wareham Gatemen faced the Yarmouth-Dennis Red Sox on July 24, 2018, at the park. The Gatemen defeated the Red Sox 10–4 in front of an attendance of 376 with Yarmouth-Dennis as the home team. The same teams played a second game at Dunkin' Park on July 23, 2019. The Gatemen defeated the Red Sox 3–2 in front of an attendance of 1,500 with Wareham as the home team. On July 26, 2023, the Yarmouth-Dennis Red Sox will play their third game at the park, hosted by the Hyannis Harbor Hawks.

=== International baseball ===
During the 2019-20 offseason, the Yard Goats announced they would host an international exhibition game between the Bristol Blues, of the New England Collegiate Baseball League (NECBL) and the Israel national baseball team on July 16, 2020, as a warmup for the 2020 Summer Olympics. But due to the COVID-19 pandemic, this game was cancelled. Team Israel came to Hartford in 2021 on July 14 to play against the Blues, losing to Bristol 10 to 2, and on July 15 Ocean State Waves (NECBL), winning 15 to 2, as they prepared for the rescheduled Olympic games.

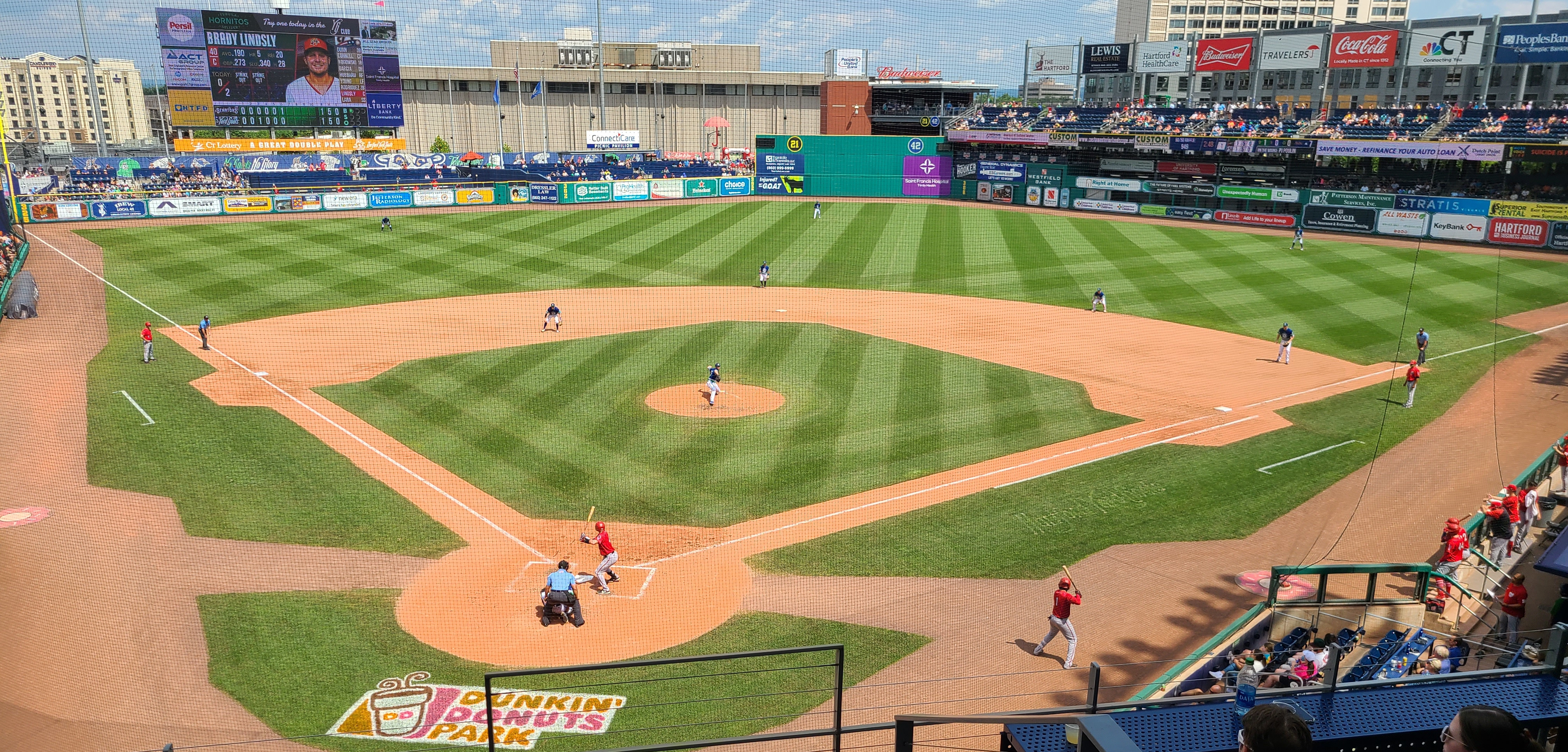
Yard Goats vs Harrisburg Senators - July 17, 2022

=== Home Run Derby X ===
On June 12, 2023, Major League Baseball announced that the 2023 MLB Home Run Derby X would be making a stop in Hartford at Dunkin' Park on August 11 with former major leaguers Nick Swisher and Jonny Gomes.

=== Savannah Bananas ===
The Savannah Bananas played the Party Animals at Dunkin' Park on August 14, 2023, winning 5-4. Banana Ball will return to Hartford in 2026 for a three-game series between the Party Animals and the Indianapolis Clowns from Thursday, July 23 through Saturday, July 25.

=== Links at the Yard ===
The Links at the Yard is a unique golf experience in Downtown Hartford presented by the Callaway Golf Company. On August 8, 2018, the partnership between the Yard Goats and Callaway was first announced to occur from September 27 through September 30. On June 25, 2019, the Yard Goats announced they would continue their partnership for a second Links at the Yard, from September 26 through September 29. Following the COVID-19 pandemic, the Yard Goats and Callaway continued their partnership with a third event scheduled to occur from October 14 through October 17.
