= Double-A (baseball) =

Second-highest level of competition in Minor League Baseball

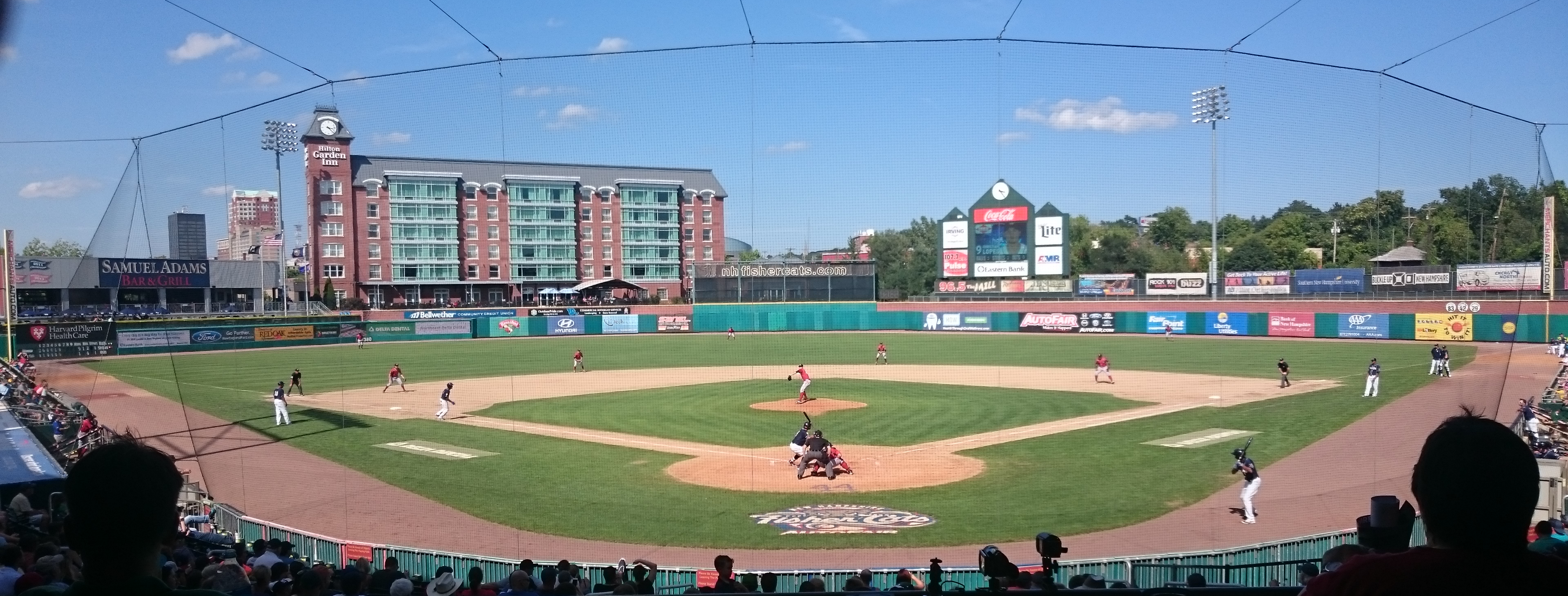
A Double-A baseball game between the New Hampshire Fisher Cats and Altoona Curve at Delta Dental Stadium in Manchester, New Hampshire, in August 2016

Double-A (officially Class AA) is the second-highest level of play in Minor League Baseball in the United States since 1946, below only Triple-A. There are 30 teams classified at the Double-A level, one for each team in Major League Baseball, organized into three leagues: the Eastern League, the Southern League, and the Texas League.

== History ==
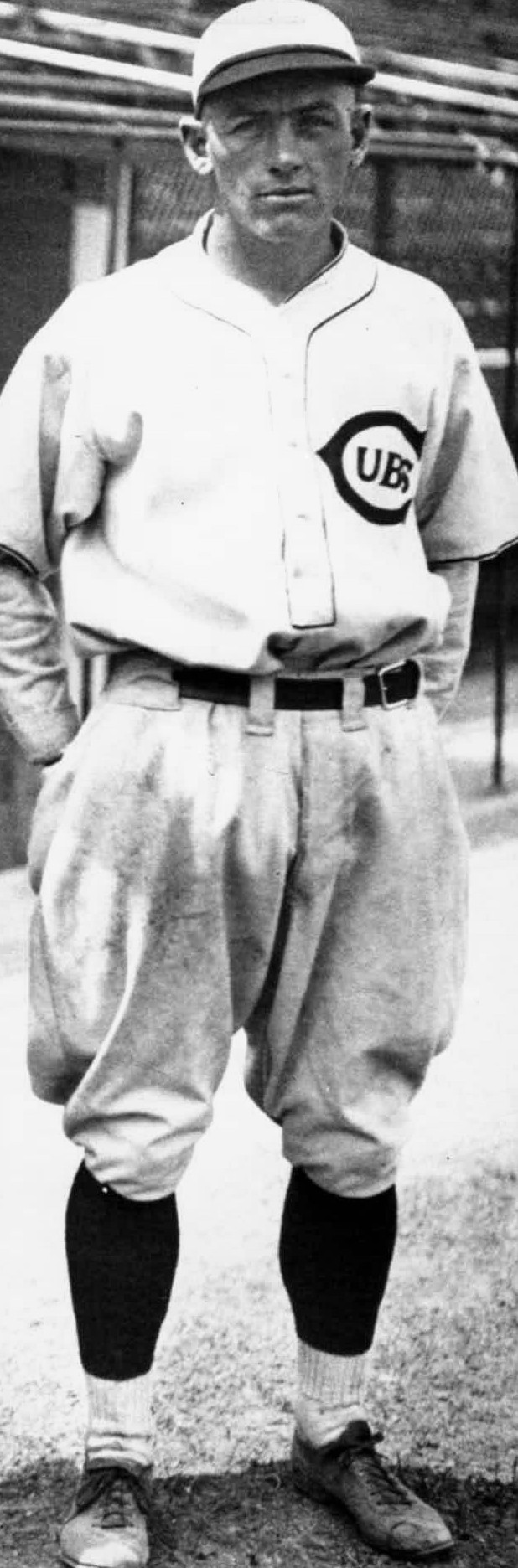
Jigger Statz, pictured in 1922, played in over 2700 Minor League Baseball games, all at the Double-A level in the Pacific Coast League between 1920 and 1942

Class AA ("Double-A") was established in 1912, as the new highest classification of Minor League Baseball. Previously, Class A had been the highest level, predating the establishment of the National Association of Professional Baseball Leagues—the formal name of Minor League Baseball—in 1901. Entering the 1912 season, three leagues were designated as Class AA:

- American Association (AA)
- International League (IL)
- Pacific Coast League (PCL)

Each of these leagues had previously been in Class A. Each remained in Class AA through 1945, then moved into Class AAA ("Triple-A") when it was established in 1946. No other leagues were designated Class AA during 1912–1945, although a Class A1 level (between Class A and Class AA) was established in 1936.

The contemporary Double-A classification, as the second-highest level in Minor League Baseball, was established in 1946. Entering that season, the three aforementioned leagues in Class AA all moved to the newly established Triple-A, and Class A1 became Double-A with two leagues:

- Southern Association, previously Class A1 (1936–1945)
- Texas League, previously Class A1 (1936–1942; idle for three seasons during World War II)

The Texas League remained in Double-A for the next 75 years. During this time, there were limited changes to leagues at the Double-A level:

- 1955: the Mexican League, previously independent, was classified as Double-A
- 1961: final season of the Southern Association
- 1963: the Eastern League and original South Atlantic League were moved from Class A to Double-A
- 1964: the original South Atlantic League was reconstituted as the Southern League
- 1967: the Mexican League moved to Triple-A

Entering the 2020 minor league season (which was not played, due to the COVID-19 pandemic) the Texas League had been in Double-A since 1946, the Eastern League since 1963, and the Southern League since 1964. Prior to the 2021 season, Major League Baseball (MLB) reorganized the minor leagues. At that time, the existing leagues were temporarily renamed: Eastern League as Double-A Northeast, Southern League as Double-A South, and Texas League as Double-A Central. Following MLB's acquisition of the rights to the names of the historical minor leagues, MLB announced on March 16, 2022, that the leagues would revert to their prior names, effective with the 2022 season.

== System ==
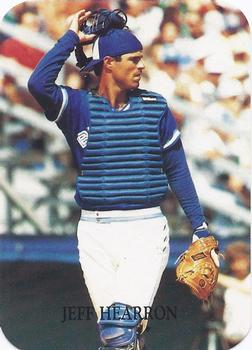
In August 1985, after playing for several Double-A level teams, Jeff Hearron was signed by the Toronto Blue Jays of Major League Baseball

The Double-A classification usually hosts developing players that have been part of professional baseball for only a couple of years. These players can get to the Double-A level by earning a promotion from any of the lower-level leagues, with High-A being immediately below Double-A in the minor league hierarchy.

The step up to the Double-A level can be one of the hardest promotions for such players because it is the level at which pitchers need to have a good off-speed pitch in their repertoires. In addition, it is the level where fastball-only hitters need to learn how to hit off-speed pitches, or their hopes of advancing to the majors will diminish. Some players may be placed in Double-A to begin their minor league careers, usually veterans from foreign leagues or top prospects out of college. Additionally, major league clubs sometimes send players to their Double-A team to rehabilitate from injuries.

While Triple-A is the highest level in the minor leagues, players may also advance to the major leagues directly from Double-A. For example, within the Toronto Blue Jays organization, 17 position players were promoted from Double-A directly to MLB during 1978–2018; approximately one player every two seasons. As players at the Double-A level are, generally, still improving their skills, it could be argued that the pure talent level is higher in Double-A than Triple-A, where there may be some stagnation of talent.

Because players are not often moved back and forth from their major league parent club as often happens in Triple-A, the rosters of Double-A teams tend to be more stable. Fans of Double-A teams thus have a longer amount of time to get acquainted with the players, which helps create a better relationship between the team and its fans.

== Current teams ==
Current Double-A team locations:
Texas League
Eastern League
Southern League

=== Texas League ===
Division	Team	MLB affiliation	City	Stadium	Capacity
North	Arkansas Travelers	Seattle Mariners	North Little Rock, Arkansas	Dickey–Stephens Park	7,200
North	Northwest Arkansas Naturals	Kansas City Royals	Springdale, Arkansas	Arvest Ballpark	7,305
North	Ozarks Springbirds	St. Louis Cardinals	Springfield, Missouri	Route 66 Stadium	10,486
North	Tulsa Drillers	Los Angeles Dodgers	Tulsa, Oklahoma	ONEOK Field	7,833
North	Wichita Turbo Tubs	Minnesota Twins	Wichita, Kansas	Equity Bank Park	12,000
South	Amarillo Sod Poodles	Arizona Diamondbacks	Amarillo, Texas	Hodgetown	6,631
South	Corpus Christi Hooks	Houston Astros	Corpus Christi, Texas	Whataburger Field	7,679
South	Frisco RoughRiders	Texas Rangers	Frisco, Texas	Riders Field	10,316
South	Midland RockHounds	Athletics	Midland, Texas	Momentum Bank Ballpark	6,669
South	San Antonio Missions	San Diego Padres	San Antonio, Texas	Nelson W. Wolff Municipal Stadium	9,200

=== Eastern League ===
Division	Team	MLB affiliation	City	Stadium	Capacity
Northeast	Binghamton Rumble Ponies	New York Mets	Binghamton, New York	Mirabito Stadium	6,012
Northeast	Hartford Yard Goats	Colorado Rockies	Hartford, Connecticut	Dunkin' Park	6,121
Northeast	New Hampshire Fisher Cats	Toronto Blue Jays	Manchester, New Hampshire	Delta Dental Stadium	6,500
Northeast	Portland Sea Dogs	Boston Red Sox	Portland, Maine	Delta Dental Park at Hadlock Field	7,368
Northeast	Reading Fightin Phils	Philadelphia Phillies	Reading, Pennsylvania	FirstEnergy Stadium	9,000
Northeast	Somerset Patriots	New York Yankees	Bridgewater Township, New Jersey	TD Bank Ballpark	6,100
Southwest	Akron RubberDucks	Cleveland Guardians	Akron, Ohio	7 17 Credit Union Park	7,630
Southwest	Altoona Curve	Pittsburgh Pirates	Altoona, Pennsylvania	Peoples Natural Gas Field	7,210
Southwest	Chesapeake Baysox	Baltimore Orioles	Bowie, Maryland	Prince George's Stadium	10,000
Southwest	Erie SeaWolves	Detroit Tigers	Erie, Pennsylvania	UPMC Park	6,000
Southwest	Harrisburg Senators	Washington Nationals	Harrisburg, Pennsylvania	FNB Field	6,187
Southwest	Richmond Flying Squirrels	San Francisco Giants	Richmond, Virginia	CarMax Park	10,000

=== Southern League ===
Division	Team	MLB affiliation	City	Stadium	Capacity
North	Birmingham Barons	Chicago White Sox	Birmingham, Alabama	Regions Field	8,500
North	Chattanooga Lookouts	Cincinnati Reds	Chattanooga, Tennessee	Erlanger Park	8,032
North	Knoxville Smokies	Chicago Cubs	Knoxville, Tennessee	Covenant Health Park	6,355
North	Rocket City Trash Pandas	Los Angeles Angels	Madison, Alabama	Toyota Field	7,000
South	Biloxi Shuckers	Milwaukee Brewers	Biloxi, Mississippi	Keesler Federal Park	6,076
South	Columbus Clingstones	Atlanta Braves	Columbus, Georgia	Pinnacle Park	5,500
South	Montgomery Biscuits	Tampa Bay Rays	Montgomery, Alabama	Dabos Park	7,000
South	Pensacola Blue Wahoos	Miami Marlins	Pensacola, Florida	Community Maritime Park	5,038

== Playoffs ==
Prior to the 2021 reorganization of the minor leagues, all three active Double-A leagues played split seasons, with the Eastern League moving to that system in 2019. Teams winning their division in either half of the season qualified for the postseason, with wild card teams filling out the remaining spots in a bracket tournament, usually composed of four teams.

On June 30, 2021, Minor League Baseball announced that the top two teams in each league (based on full-season winning percentage, and regardless of division) would meet in a best-of-five postseason series to determine league champions.

== All-Star Games ==
Prior to the 2021 reorganization of the minor leagues, each of the active Double-A leagues held its own midseason All-Star Game. From 1991 to 2002, the three combined to hold the Double-A All-Star Game between teams of American League-affiliated All-Stars and National League-affiliated All-Stars.

After the start of the 2021 minor league season was delayed by a month, team schedules were released without a break for an all-star game.

== Pace-of-play initiatives ==
As a part of pace-of-play initiatives implemented in 2015, 20-second pitch clocks entered use at Double-A stadiums in 2015. In 2018, the time was shortened to 15 seconds when no runners are on base. Other significant changes implemented in 2018 included beginning extra innings with a runner on second base and limiting teams to eight mound visits during a nine-inning game. In 2019, the number of mound visits was reduced to seven, and pitchers were required to face a minimum of three consecutive batters, unless the side is retired or the pitcher is injured and unable to continue.

== See also ==
- List of Double-A baseball stadiums
- List of Double-A baseball team owners
