= MLB Home Run Derby X =

Baseball competition

Tournament information
- Sport: Baseball
- Location: London; Seoul; Mexico City; Hartford; Fredericksburg
- Established: 2022
- Format: Single-elimination
- Teams: 4

MLB Home Run Derby X is a global baseball tour operated by Major League Baseball (MLB). Its first edition was in 2022. It is based on the Home Run Derby that is usually contested the day before the MLB All-Star Game.

== 2022 ==
Teams represented the Los Angeles Dodgers, the Boston Red Sox, the Chicago Cubs, and the New York Yankees. Teams included former MLB players, players from softball and women's baseball, rookies from the men's baseball development system, and "influential content creators". Adrián González played for the Dodgers, Jonny Gomes for the Red Sox, Nick Swisher for the Yankees, and Geovany Soto for the Cubs.

The 2022 event consisted of three legs: one in London, one in Seoul, and one in Mexico City. Each leg consisted of a single-elimination bracket with a third place playoff for classification (London only, starting with Seoul, third place was awarded to the team with the most home runs in the preliminaries. Teams received five points for winning a leg, three points for second place, and one point for third place. Cryptocurrency exchange company FTX was the title sponsor, in continuation of a partnership with MLB announced in mid-2021.

The Red Sox won the 2022 tournament.

=== London ===
The London leg was held at Crystal Palace Park on July 9. AJ Tracey headlined the event, described as "baseball meets festival vibes". Zach Stroman, who has played for the London Mets, represented the Dodgers at the event.

In the final, the Yankees defeated the Red Sox, 42–41, after London-born Richard Brereton hit a walk-off home run. Erika Piancastelli of the Yankees was named MVP of the London tournament. In the third-place game, the Dodgers defeated the Cubs, 53–38.

=== Seoul ===
The Seoul leg was held on September 17 at Paradise City.

In the preliminaries, the Red Sox defeated the Yankees 60–49, while the Dodgers defeated the Cubs 55–54. In the finals, the Dodgers defeated the Red Sox 60–55. Adrian Gonzalez was named MVP on the day.

=== Mexico City ===
The Mexico City leg was held on October 15 at Campo Marte.

In the preliminaries, the Red Sox defeated the Cubs 62–51, while the Dodgers defeated the Yankees 68–63. In the finals, the Red Sox defeated the Dodgers 57–56. Jocelyn Alo was named site MVP.

=== Standings ===
Team	Points	First place (5 points)	Second place (3 points)	Third Place (1 point)	Fourth Place (0 points)
Red Sox	11	1 (Mexico City)	2 (London, Seoul)	0	0
Dodgers	9	1 (Seoul)	1 (Mexico City)	1 (London)	0
Yankees	6	1 (London)	0	1 (Mexico City)	1 (Seoul)
Cubs	1	0	0	1 (Seoul)	2 (London, Mexico City)

== 2023 ==
In 2023, the first Home Run Derby X event, branded as "The Cage," was held at Trafalgar Square in London on June 23, in conjunction with the 2023 MLB London Series. The Cubs won the London event.

The event's first U.S. leg was held on August 11 at Dunkin' Park in Hartford, Connecticut, home of the Hartford Yard Goats of the Eastern League. Four teams competed, each led by a retired MLB player: Jake Arrieta's Schoolboys, Jonny Gomes's Steamed Cheeseburgers, Dexter Fowler's Los Chivos, and Nick Swisher's Bouncing Pickles. The Schoolboys defeated the Steamed Cheeseburgers, 49–48, in the final round. The Schoolboys received $4,000 for their chosen charity, the Hartford Police Athletic League, which Arrieta matched personally.

On August 25 and 26, MLB presented a Home Run Derby X event in Fredericksburg, Virginia at Virginia Credit Union Stadium, home of the Fredericksburg Nationals. The Fredericksburg event featured four teams: the Choppin' Georges, including Jocelyn Alo and Gerardo Parra; the Freddies, including Ian Desmond; the FUNdadores, including Jonny Gomes; and the Gus Bus, featuring Jake Arrieta and Baylee Klingler. In the final, the Freddies defeated the Gus Bus, 56–55.

== 2024 ==
The 2024 event will be a three-on-three competition, with each team composed of a former MLB player, a women's baseball or softball player, and a local player. Events will be held on August 10 at Parkview Field in Fort Wayne, Indiana; on August 23 at Isotopes Park in Albuquerque; on August 31 at First Horizon Park in Nashville; and on September 7 at Durham Bulls Athletic Park in Durham, North Carolina.
