= Nick Swisher =

American baseball player (born 1980)

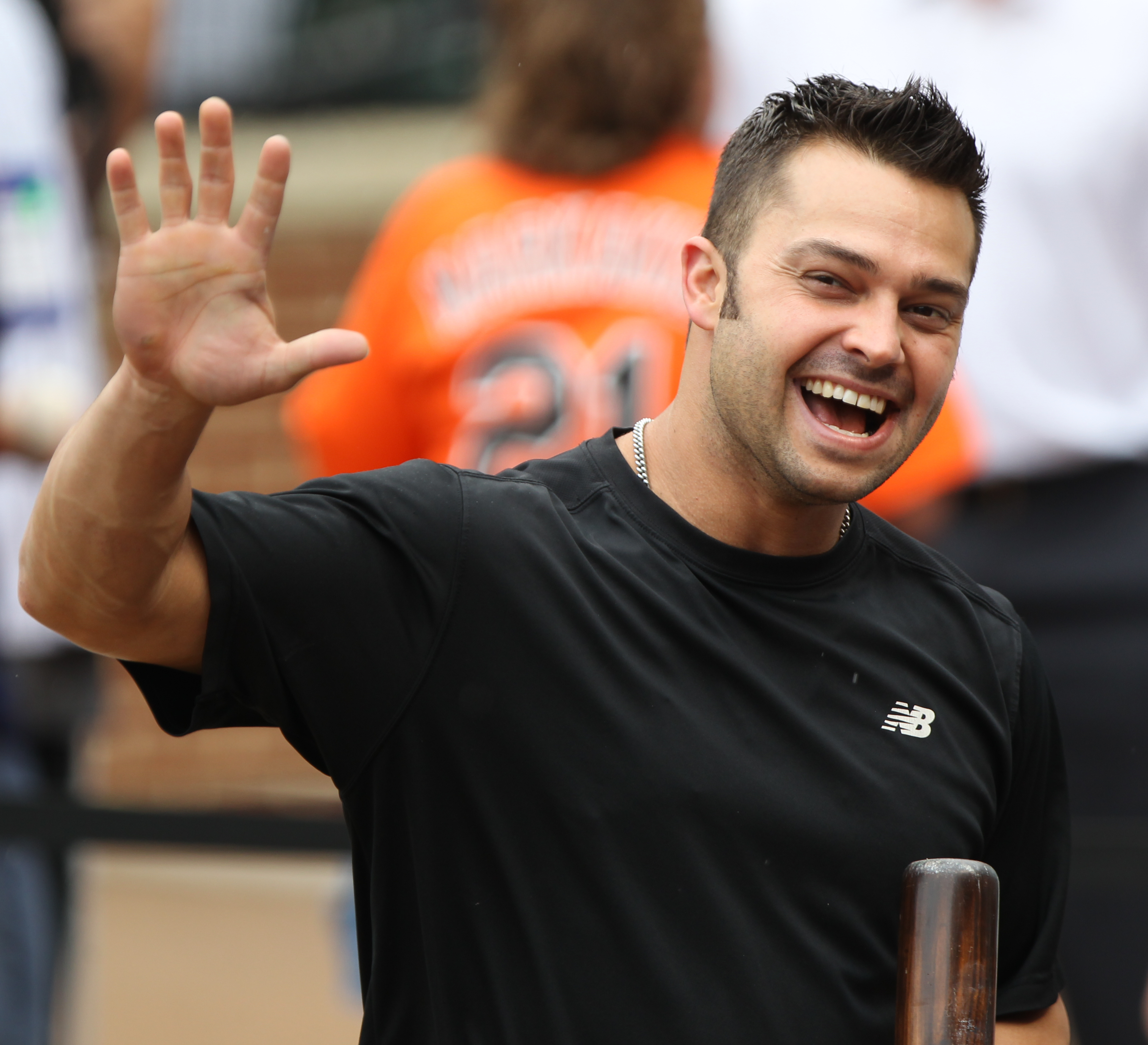
- Swisher in 2011
- Outfielder / First baseman
- Born: November 25, 1980 (age 45); Columbus, Ohio, U.S.
- Batted: Switch Threw: Left

MLB debut
- September 3, 2004, for the Oakland Athletics

Last MLB appearance
- October 2, 2015, for the Atlanta Braves

MLB statistics
- Batting average: .249
- Home runs: 245
- Runs batted in: 803
- Stats at Baseball Reference

Teams
- Oakland Athletics (2004–2007); Chicago White Sox (2008); New York Yankees (2009–2012); Cleveland Indians (2013–2015); Atlanta Braves (2015)

Career highlights and awards
- All-Star (2010); World Series champion (2009)

Nicholas Thompson Swisher (born November 25, 1980) is an American professional baseball analyst and former outfielder and first baseman in Major League Baseball (MLB). He was a switch hitter who threw left-handed, and played for the Oakland Athletics, Chicago White Sox, New York Yankees, Cleveland Indians and Atlanta Braves. He won the 2009 World Series with the Yankees and was an All-Star in 2010. A power hitter with excellent plate discipline, Swisher hit at least 20 home runs in each of nine consecutive seasons from 2005 to 2013, and reached 75 bases on balls on seven occasions in that span.

Swisher is the son of former MLB catcher Steve Swisher, who played for various National League baseball clubs in the 1970s and 1980s. Swisher was born in Columbus, Ohio, but grew up in Parkersburg, West Virginia. Before his professional career, Swisher played college baseball for the Ohio State Buckeyes. Drafted by the A's in the 2002 MLB draft, Swisher made his MLB debut with the Athletics in 2004, and played for the team through 2007. After he spent one year with the White Sox in 2008, the Yankees acquired him prior to the start of the 2009 campaign. He played in New York for four years before signing with the Cleveland Indians prior to the 2013 season.

== Early life ==
Swisher was born in Columbus, Ohio, the son of Lillian Marie (Vaught) Malizia and Steve Swisher, a Major League Baseball (MLB) player. His mother was of part Italian descent; her grandfather immigrated to the Buffalo, New York, area from the town of Oliveri, in Sicily. Swisher's parents divorced when he was 11 years old. He then went to live with his grandparents in Parkersburg, West Virginia, who raised him during his teenage years.

== Amateur career ==
Swisher attended Parkersburg High School where he was a three-sport star, playing football and baseball, while lettering in basketball. As a strong safety on his football team, he was recruited by several Division I-A college football programs, including the University of Notre Dame, but chose to pursue baseball.

Undrafted out of high school, Swisher enrolled at Ohio State University, as that school and Ohio University were the only colleges to recruit him for baseball. Playing for the Ohio State Buckeyes baseball team in the Big Ten Conference, Swisher was named Big Ten Freshman of the Year in 2000, after hitting .299 with 10 home runs and 48 runs batted in (RBI). In 2000, he played collegiate summer baseball with the Wareham Gatemen of the Cape Cod Baseball League. He was an All-Big Ten selection as a first baseman as a sophomore in 2001, after hitting .322 with 56 RBI and a league-leading 15 home runs. He earned All-Big Ten honors as an outfielder in 2002, after batting .348 with 10 home runs and 52 RBI.

== Professional career ==
=== Draft and minor leagues ===
The Oakland Athletics selected Swisher in the first round, with the 16th overall selection, of the 2002 MLB draft. They received the pick from the Boston Red Sox as compensation for the signing of free agent Johnny Damon. Swisher and the Athletics' 2002 draft are heavily featured in Michael Lewis' 2003 book Moneyball. In a book whose key theme is the gulf between orthodox baseball thinking and the new sabermetric-influenced system being implemented by Billy Beane, Swisher was notable as one of the few examples of a player whom traditional scouts and Beane could agree upon.

Swisher made his professional debut with the Vancouver Canadians of the Class A-Short Season Northwest League in 2002, batting .250 with two home runs and 12 RBI in 13 games. He was later promoted to the Visalia Oaks of the Class A-Advanced California League, where he batted .240 with four home runs and 23 RBI in 49 games. Swisher started the 2003 season with the Modesto A's, Oakland's new California League affiliate, where he batted .296 with 10 home runs and 43 RBI in 51 games before receiving a promotion to the Midland RockHounds of the Class AA Texas League in June. He batted .230 with five home runs and 43 RBI in 76 games for Midland to finish the season, and then played in the Arizona Fall League for the Mesa Desert Dogs.

Swisher played for the Sacramento River Cats of the Class AAA Pacific Coast League for the 2004 season, batting .269 with 29 home runs and 92 RBI in 125 games. That season, he led all minor league baseball players with 103 walks.

=== Major league career ===
==== Oakland Athletics (2004–2007) ====
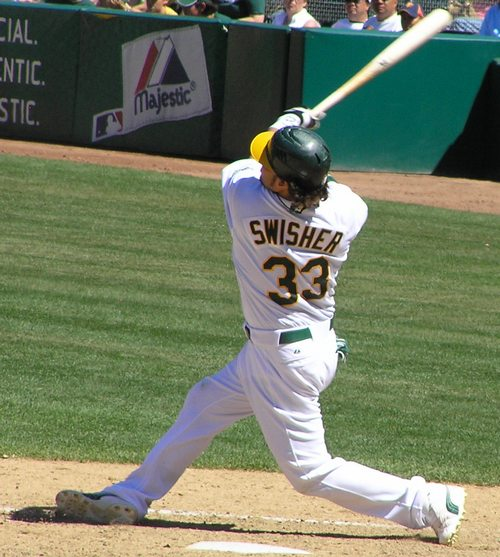
Swisher batting for the Oakland Athletics in 2005

Swisher made his MLB debut in 2004 for the Athletics, playing in 20 games. Retaining his rookie status for 2005, (Note: Though Swisher debuted with the Athletics in 2004, he qualified as a rookie in 2005, as he had less than 130 at-bats during the 2004 season.) Swisher batted .236 with 21 home runs and 74 RBI in 131 games for the Athletics. He finished sixth in the American League Rookie of the Year voting. Teammate Huston Street won the award, while fellow 2002 Oakland draftee Joe Blanton finished seventh.

Following his rookie season, Swisher improved in most offensive categories. During the 2006 regular season, Swisher compiled a .254 batting average with 35 home runs and 95 RBI (both career-highs) in 157 games. He also improved his on-base percentage by raising it to .372, as well as boosting his slugging percentage to .493. Swisher finished second for the team in on-base plus slugging (OPS) behind veteran slugger Frank Thomas. Swisher spent about half of his playing time in left field, and the other half at first base. The A's lacked both Dan Johnson and Erubiel Durazo for a large portion of the 2006 season, leaving room for Swisher to move back into his preferred position on a temporary basis. During the season, Swisher wrote a column for ESPN.com about his various baseball experiences called Sophomore Year. This included multiple articles that pertained to his early MLB playing experiences, as well as the MLB Draft of 2002.

Swisher made his postseason debut as the Athletics took on the Minnesota Twins in the 2006 ALDS. Swisher got three hits and an RBI during the series as the A's performed a three-game sweep against the Twins to advance to the ALCS. During the 2006 ALCS vs the Detroit Tigers, Swisher had a .100 batting average with one hit as Oakland would eventually lose the ALCS to the Tigers in four games.

On May 11, 2007, Swisher signed a five-year, $26.75 million contract extension with Oakland that included a club option for 2012. On September 16, 2007, Swisher initiated a brawl when he charged the mound after getting hit by a pitch from Texas Rangers pitcher Vicente Padilla. Earlier in the plate appearance, Padilla (who had hit Swisher the prior year) threw two inside pitches with the apparent intention of hitting Swisher. Both players were ejected following the brawl, and Swisher received a three-game suspension.

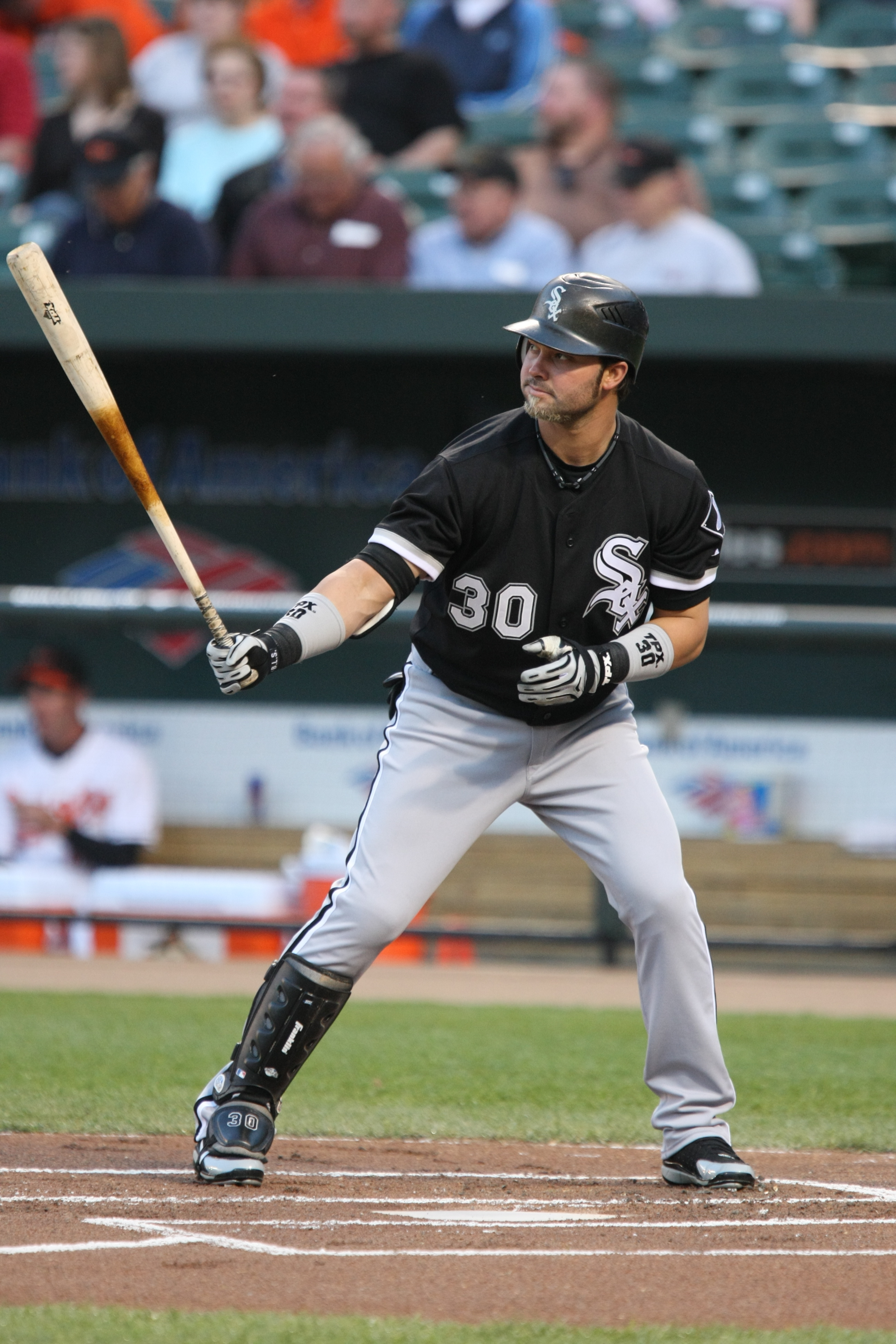
Swisher in 2008 with the Chicago White Sox

==== Chicago White Sox (2008) ====
Swisher was traded on January 3, 2008 to the Chicago White Sox for minor leaguers Ryan Sweeney, Gio González, and Fautino de los Santos as part of what Athletics general manager Billy Beane termed a "rebuilding effort". While Swisher quickly established himself as a fan favorite on his new team, he struggled offensively, batting just .219 through the season (the lowest batting average in the majors), though he improved his home run total from 22 in 2007 to 24 in 2008. He also led the majors in pitches per plate appearance, with 4.51. Because of his poor offensive play, White Sox manager Ozzie Guillén benched Swisher for most of September, saying publicly that "I have to put the best lineup out there to win the game ... To me, the best lineup right now is without (Swisher)." Swisher finished the 2008 regular season with a .219 batting average, 24 home runs, and 69 RBI in 153 games.

Despite his career-low stats in the regular season, Swisher was included in the postseason roster for the White Sox. During the 2008 ALDS against the Tampa Bay Rays, Swisher had a hit and two walks. The White Sox would eventually lose the division series against the Rays in four games.

==== New York Yankees (2009–2012) ====
On November 13, 2008, the White Sox traded Swisher and minor league pitcher Kanekoa Texeira to the New York Yankees for utility man Wilson Betemit and minor league pitchers Jeff Marquez and Jhonny Núñez. Swisher was acquired to be the Yankees starting first baseman. However, the Yankees signed Mark Teixeira later in the offseason, who took the starting role. At the end of spring training, manager Joe Girardi announced that Xavier Nady would be starting in right field while Swisher would be a bench player. Due to the perceived logjam, many teams reportedly pursued Swisher, but the Yankees opted to keep him as a reserve outfielder and first baseman.

On April 9, 2009, in a game against the Baltimore Orioles, Swisher started for the first time as a Yankee in right field, replacing Xavier Nady, who was playing DH to give Hideki Matsui a rest. Swisher went 3-for-5 with a home run and tied his career high of five RBIs. Just five days later, Swisher became the starting right fielder after Nady went on the disabled list due to an elbow injury.

On April 13, 2009, in a game against the Tampa Bay Rays, Swisher pitched one inning in relief, allowing one hit and one walk before retiring the next three batters in a row, including a strikeout against Gabe Kapler, in his first pitching appearance in the major leagues. He was the first Yankee position player to pitch since Wade Boggs in 1997, and the first Yankee to homer and pitch in the same game since Lindy McDaniel did it in Detroit on September 28, 1972. Swisher finished his first season as a Yankee batting .249 with 29 home runs and 82 RBI in 150 games.

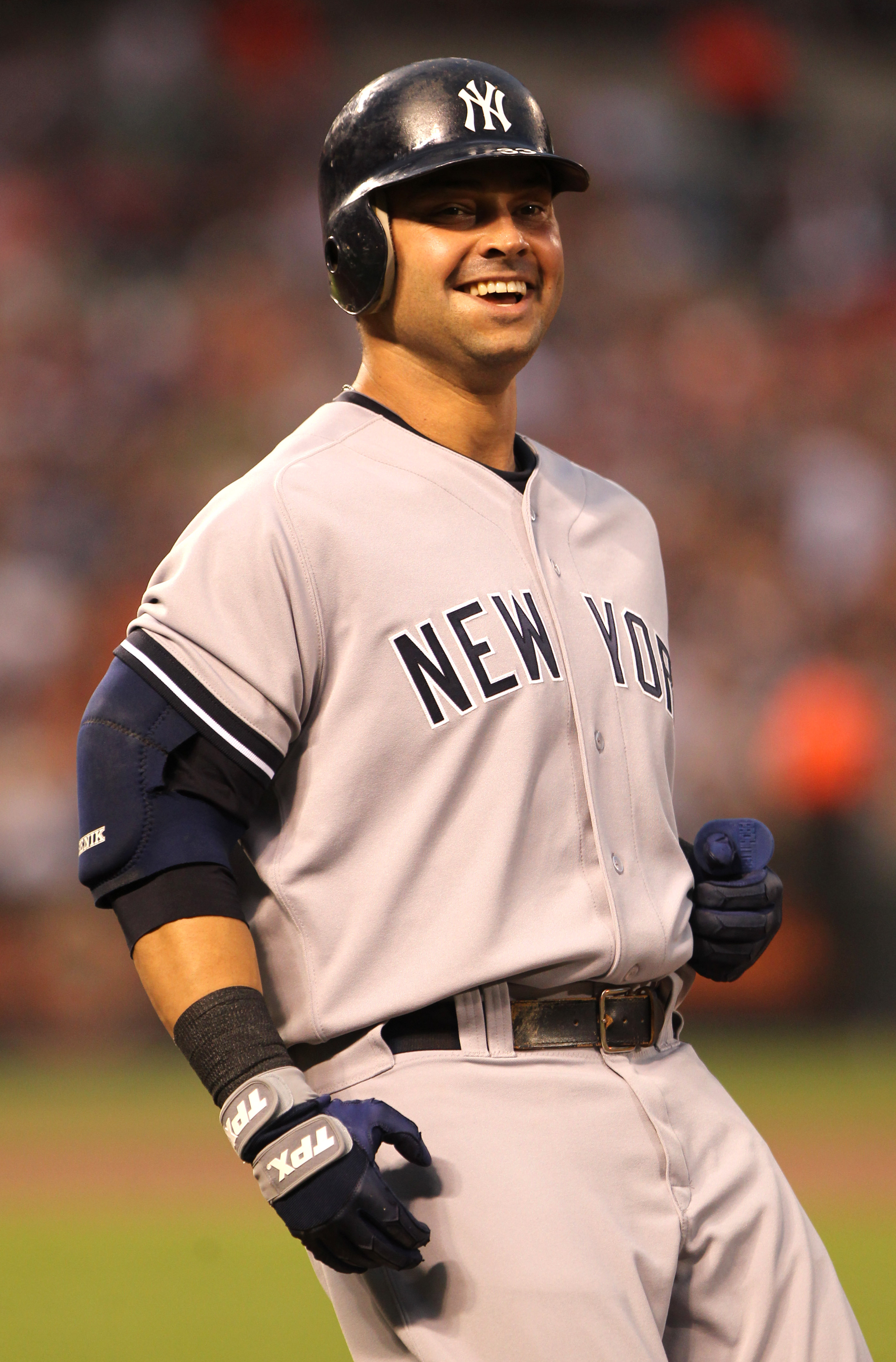
Swisher during a game for the New York Yankees in 2011

Swisher hit his first postseason home run in the 2009 World Series. He got his only championship title as the Yankees eventually won the World Series against the Philadelphia Phillies in six games.

Due to a .128 batting average in the 2009 postseason, Swisher worked with hitting coach Kevin Long to reinvent his swing for the 2010 season. Swisher was a contestant in the 2010 All-Star Final Vote from July 4 to 8. Swisher lobbied for the post with a promotion commercial of him with a surf board to indicate that he would be surfing in Southern California since the game was to be hosted by the Los Angeles Angels of Anaheim. In what was to that date the closest vote in Final Vote history, he won the final place on the AL roster ahead of Red Sox first baseman Kevin Youkilis. Additionally, Swisher participated in the Home Run Derby. Swisher finished the season with a career-high .288 batting average, 29 home runs and 89 RBI in 150 games. Although Swisher was usually hitting in the bottom third of the lineup, he was moved into the #2 slot in the lineup after Nick Johnson went down with an injury.

In 2011, Swisher was moved down in the lineup to allow Curtis Granderson to hit second behind Derek Jeter; Swisher spent the majority of the season hitting sixth behind Robinson Canó. His .996 fielding percentage ranked second among all American League right fielders, behind Baltimore's Nick Markakis. Although Swisher's offensive totals dipped slightly from his 2010 career year, he still managed to hit .260, and was one of four Yankees with at least 20 home runs (together with Granderson, Teixeira, and Canó), and finished fourth on the team with 85 RBI.

On November 9, 2012, Swisher declined a $13.3 million one-year qualifying offer from the Yankees, making him a free agent. Under the new collective bargaining agreement, the Yankees received a compensatory pick because the Indians signed Swisher, but it was not the Indians' pick. Cleveland, in turn, surrendered its highest pick outside of the top ten, but that pick did not go to the Yankees: The Indians' slot was instead skipped in the draft.

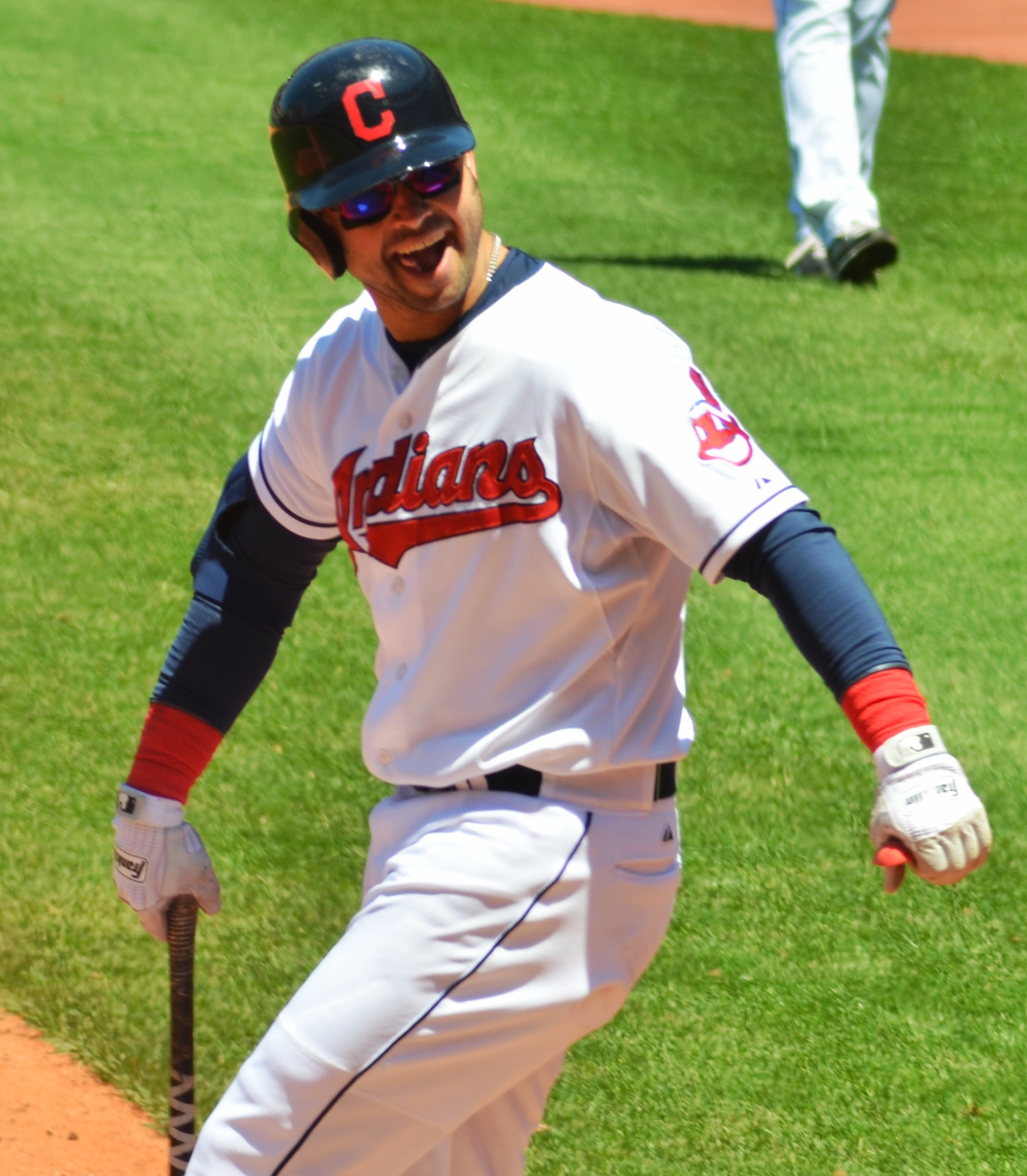
Swisher during his tenure with the Cleveland Indians in 2013

==== Cleveland Indians (2013-2015) ====
On December 23, 2012, Swisher agreed to a four-year, $56 million contract with the Cleveland Indians. The contract reportedly included a fifth year vesting option worth $14 million, making the total contract worth $70 million. The deal became official on January 3, 2013. He soon called a section of the stadium Brohio. The Yankees received a compensation draft pick for the 2013 MLB draft as a result of losing Swisher, subsequently using it on Aaron Judge.

The 2014 season marked a difficult one for Swisher, as injuries had caused him to post career lows in batting average (.208), games played (97) and home runs (8). On June 19, 2014, after going 0–4 at the plate with three strike outs, and with two outs and two strikes, Swisher hit a walk-off grand slam against the Los Angeles Angels of Anaheim, propelling the Indians to a 5–3 win in 10 innings. On August 20, the Indians announced that Swisher would have arthroscopic surgery on both of his knees, ending his season.

Swisher began the 2015 season on the 15-day disabled list, still recovering from surgery on both knees. On May 5, Swisher was activated from the disabled list, and played almost exclusively at DH for Cleveland, but was placed on the 15-day disabled list with left knee inflammation on June 14.

==== Atlanta Braves (2015) ====
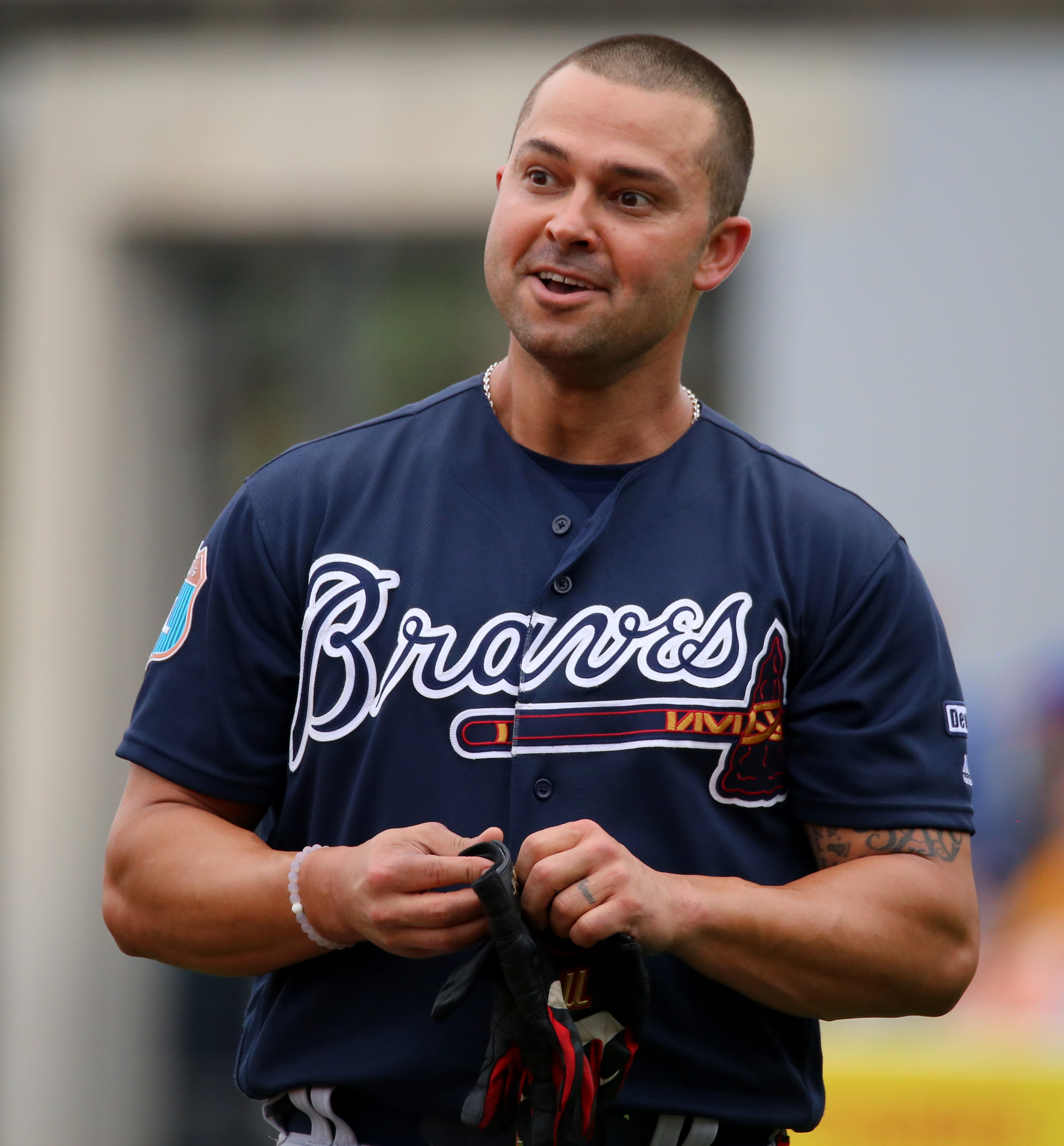
Swisher playing for the Atlanta Braves in 2016 spring training

On August 7, 2015, the Indians traded Swisher and Michael Bourn with cash considerations to the Atlanta Braves for Chris Johnson. Swisher batted .195 in 46 games for the Braves. On March 28, 2016, the Braves released Swisher, despite owing him $15 million for the 2016 season.

==== Second stint with Yankees ====
On April 14, 2016, Swisher signed a minor league contract to return to the Yankees. They assigned him to the Scranton/Wilkes-Barre RailRiders of the Class AAA International League. Playing first base, Swisher batted .255 with seven home runs and 25 RBI in 55 games. The Yankees opted not to promote Swisher to the major leagues, in spite of injuries suffered by Mark Teixeira, Dustin Ackley, and Chris Parmelee. On July 2, Swisher opted out of his contract to be with his family following the birth of his second daughter. He announced his retirement on February 17, 2017, and became an analyst for Fox.

==== After retirement ====
Swisher represented the Yankees in the 2022 MLB Home Run Derby X.

In 2026, Swisher began hosting baseball-centric episodes of the All the Smoke podcast, branded as All the Smoke Baseball, with Matt Barnes and Chris Young.

== Personal life ==
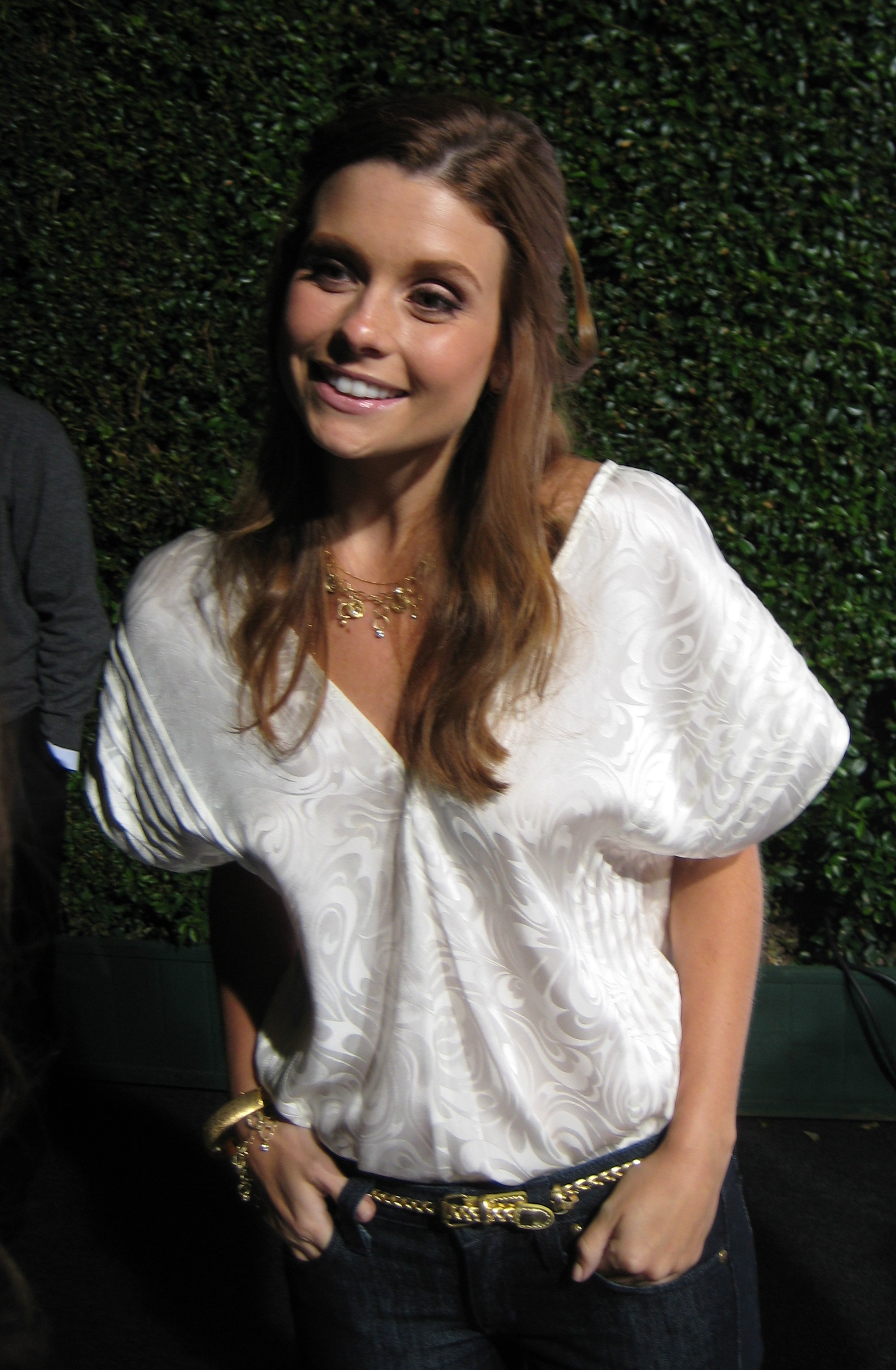
Swisher is married to actress JoAnna Garcia

Swisher and JoAnna on a USO tour in Afghanistan in 2011

=== Family members ===
Swisher's father, Steve Swisher, played 509 games in the major leagues with the Chicago Cubs, St. Louis Cardinals, and San Diego Padres from 1974 through 1982.

Swisher was very close to his paternal grandmother, Betty Lorraine Swisher, who raised him after his parents' divorce. She died from brain cancer in 2005; he has a memorial tattoo in her honor on his chest (her initials, surrounded by angel's wings and a halo.) Swisher routinely looked up to the sky to honor his parents and grandparents. He also touched his lips and pointed to the sky in his grandmother's honor after he got a hit. In addition, he inked her initials on the bottom of his bats' knobs, and kissed the letters when he came to home plate. To honor her further, he let his hair grow for eleven months and donated it to Pantene Beautiful Lengths, a program that creates free wigs for cancer patients. On May 19, 2007, he cut his hair with assistance from his father. His website, nickswisher.net, is also dedicated to his grandmother. After his grandfather, Don, died in November 2008, Swisher began adding his initials to his bats as well. He later stated that he planned on getting another tattoo on his back in the same style as his existing one after the 2009 season to honor his grandfather.

=== Marriage ===
In August 2009, People reported that Swisher was dating actress JoAnna Garcia. Swisher and García became engaged in May 2010, and married on December 11, 2010, at the Breakers Hotel & Resort in Palm Beach, Florida. The couple has two daughters, born in May 2013 and June 2016.

In 2011, Swisher guest starred as himself on two episodes of his wife's sitcom, Better with You. The first episode aired February 16 and the second aired February 23. He also appeared in the episode "Perfect Week" of How I Met Your Mother, which aired in February 2010.

=== Charity album ===
Swisher released a children's music album titled Believe on August 9, 2011. A percentage of the proceeds was to be donated to "Swish's Wishes", a charity started by Swisher for children who are facing health crises. The 12-song album features guest appearances from Bernie Williams and Barry Zito. All of the songs recorded on the album are cover songs that were selected by Swisher. The album peaked at #3 on the chart of iTunes Children's Albums.

== Awards and honors ==
- Two-time All-Big Ten (2001, 2002)
- 2009 World Series Champion
- 2010 MLB All-Star
- Playing field at Buckeyes' home ballpark named in his honor ("Nick Swisher Field at Bill Davis Stadium")
- Recipient of the Bob Feller Act of Valor Award in 2014.

== See also ==
- List of second-generation Major League Baseball players
- List of Major League Baseball career home run leaders
- 2021 Baseball Hall of Fame balloting
