= Binghamton Rumble Ponies =

- Founded in 1992; Binghamton, New York
Team logo
Cap insignia

Minor league affiliations
- Class: Double-A (1992–present)
- League: Eastern League (1992–present)
- Division: Northeast Division

Major league affiliations
- Team: New York Mets (1992–present)

Minor league titles
- League titles (4): 1992; 1994; 2014; 2025
- Division titles (5): 1994; 2000; 2014; 2023; 2025
- First-half titles (1): 2025
- Second-half titles (2): 2023; 2025

Team data
- Name: Binghamton Rumble Ponies (2017–present)
- Previous names: Binghamton Mets (1992–2016)
- Colors: Navy blue, red, silver, white
- Ballpark: Mirabito Stadium (1992–present)
- Owner/ Operator: Diamond Baseball Holdings
- General manager: Richard Tylicki
- Manager: Michael Collins
- Website: milb.com/binghamton

The Binghamton Rumble Ponies are an American Minor League Baseball team based in Binghamton, New York. The team, which plays in the Eastern League, is the Double-A affiliate of the New York Mets major-league club. The Rumble Ponies play in Mirabito Stadium, located in Binghamton.

== History ==
In 1991, the New York Mets purchased the Williamsport Bills, and moved them to Binghamton, New York, in 1992 as the Binghamton Mets.

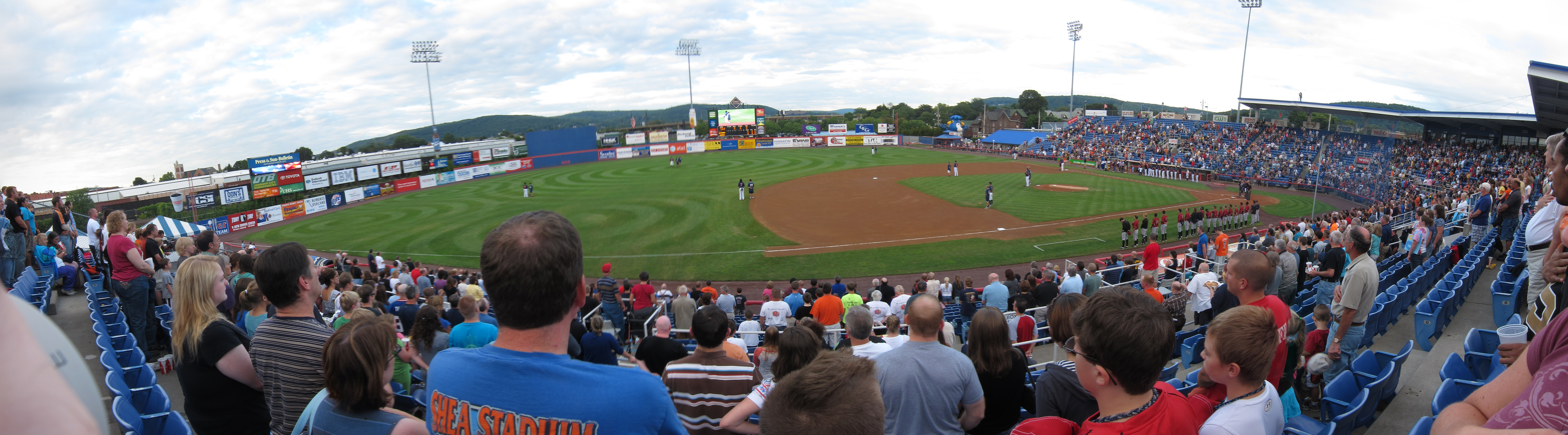
Mirabito Stadium

In 2016, the franchise announced a plan to stay in Binghamton for the foreseeable future, and to change the team's name. The team held a name-the-team contest on its website from May 17 to June 1; the finalists were the Bullheads (for the bullhead catfish abundant in the nearby Susquehanna River), Gobblers (for the rich hunting culture of the area, as well as the turkeys in Binghamton), Rocking Horses (for the Triple Cities' nickname as the "Carousel Capital of The World"), Rumble Ponies (also a carousel tribute), Stud Muffins (for the collections of carousel horses in Binghamton), and Timber Jockeys (for everyone who rides the carousels). On November 3, 2016, the team announced that it would rename itself the Binghamton Rumble Ponies, and released a new logo. The Mets' High-A affiliate, the Brooklyn Cyclones, are also named after an amusement park ride: the Coney Island Cyclone roller coaster at Luna Park.

In 2019, Major League Baseball proposed a two-year plan to sever ties with 42 minor-league teams, including the Rumble Ponies and fellow Double-A teams such as the Erie SeaWolves and Chattanooga Lookouts. On November 10, 2020, the Mets announced they would continue their affiliation with Binghamton, saving the Rumble Ponies from closure. The team was placed in the Double-A Northeast league. In 2022, the Double-A Northeast was renamed the Eastern League, returning to the name used by the regional circuit before the 2021 reorganization.

On April 26, 2024, the Rumble Ponies' owners agreed to sell the team to Diamond Baseball Holdings.

== Roster ==
Binghamton Rumble Ponies roster
Players	Coaches/Other
Pitchers: 38 Justin Armbruester; 19 Parker Carlson; 27 Bryce Conley; 4 Felipe De La Cruz; 26 Danis Correa; 31 Gabe Davis; 36 Ryan Dollar; 15 Luke Gabrysh ~; 34 Dakota Hawkins; 35 Brendan Girton; 29 Cristofer Gomez; 21 R.J. Gordon; 7 Max Green; 26 Carlos Guzman; 10 Noah Hall; 2 Bryce Jenkins; 45 Douglas Orellana; 8 Cionel Pérez # *; 28 Gabriel Rodriguez; 26 Luis R. Rodriguez; 33 Joander Suarez; 17 Will Watson; Catchers: 1 Vincent Perozo; 11 Chris Suero; Infielders: 30 Jamari Baylor; 37 Corey Collins; 24 Eddinson Paulino; 23 Jacob Reimer; 1 Jefferson Rojas; 13 Marco Vargas; 22 Mitch Voit; Outfielders: 12 John Bay; 6 JT Benson; 14 Yohairo Cuevas; 33 Eli Serrano III	Manager: 18 Michael Collins; Coaches: 32 Matt Carasiti (pitching); 25 Mariano Duncan (bench); 5 Rachel Folden (hitting); 9 Jake Hager (assistant hitting); 60-day injured list: 33 Channing Austin; -- Joshua Cornielly (full season); 7-day injured list; * On New York Mets 40-man roster; ~ Development list; # Rehab assignment; ∞ Reserve list; ‡ Restricted list; § Suspended list; † Temporarily inactive list; Roster updated September 11, 2026; Transactions; → More rosters: MiLB • Eastern League; → New York Mets minor league players

== Season records ==
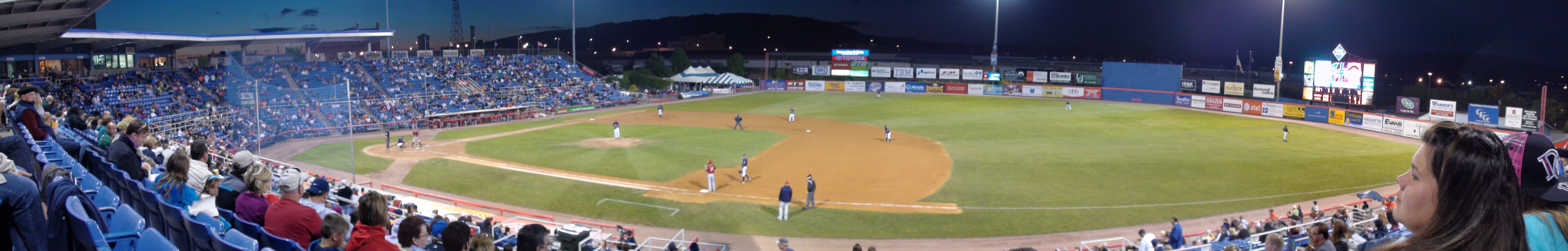
Panoramic view of the Binghamton Mets on the field at Mirabito Stadium

(Place indicates finish in Eastern League from 1992 to 1993, in the Northern Division from 1994 to 2009, in the Eastern Division from 2010 to 2020, and in the Northeastern Division from 2021. Italics indicates league champions.)

=== Binghamton Mets ===
- 1992: 79–59 (2nd), manager Steve Swisher
- 1993: 68–72 (5th), manager Steve Swisher
- 1994: 82–59 (1st), manager John Tamargo
- 1995: 67–75 (4th), manager John Tamargo
- 1996: 76–66 (2nd), manager John Tamargo
- 1997: 66–76 (4th), manager Rick Sweet
- 1998: 82–60 (2nd), manager John Gibbons
- 1999: 54–88 (6th), manager Doug Davis
- 2000: 82–58 (1st), manager Doug Davis
- 2001: 73–68 (4th), manager Howie Freiling
- 2002: 73–68 (3rd), manager Howie Freiling
- 2003: 63–78 (5th), manager John Stearns
- 2004: 76–66 (2nd), manager Ken Oberkfell
- 2005: 63–79 (6th), manager Jack Lind
- 2006: 70–70 (3rd), manager Juan Samuel
- 2007: 61–81 (6th), manager Mako Oliveras
- 2008: 73–69 (3rd), manager Mako Oliveras
- 2009: 54–86 (6th), manager Mako Oliveras
- 2010: 66–76 (5th), manager Tim Teufel
- 2011: 65–76 (5th), manager Wally Backman
- 2012: 68–74 (5th), manager Pedro López
- 2013: 86–55 (2nd), manager Pedro López
- 2014: 83–59 (1st), manager Pedro López
- 2015: 77–64 (2nd), manager Pedro López
- 2016: 63–77 (5th), manager Pedro López

=== Binghamton Rumble Ponies ===
- 2017: 85–54 (2nd), manager Luis Rojas
- 2018: 64–76 (5th), manager Luis Rojas
- 2019: 67–73 (4th), manager Kevin Boles
- 2020: Season canceled due to COVID-19 pandemic
- 2021: 47–60 (4th), manager Lorenzo Bundy
- 2022: 53–83 (6th), manager Reid Brignac
- 2023: 74–61 (2nd), manager Reid Brignac
- 2024: 69–67 (4th), manager Reid Brignac
- 2025: 90–46 (1st), manager Reid Brignac
- 2026: 61–76 (5th), manager Michael Collins

== Playoffs ==
Season	Semifinals	Finals
1992	W, 3–1, Harrisburg	W, 3–2, Canton-Akron
1994	W, 3–0, New Haven	W, 3–1, Harrisburg
1996	L, 3–2, Portland	-
1998	L, 3–1, New Britain	-
2000	L, 3–1, New Haven	-
2004	L, 3–1, New Hampshire	-
2013	L, 3–0, Trenton	-
2014	W, 3–2, Portland	W, 3–0, Richmond
2015	L, 3–0, Reading	-
2017	L, 3–1, Trenton	-
2023	W, 2–0, Somerset	L, 2–0, Erie
2025	W, 2–0, Somerset	W, 2–1, Erie
