= Arthur G. Pomeroy House =

Historic house in Connecticut, United States

- U.S. National Register of Historic Places
- U.S. Historic district – Contributing property
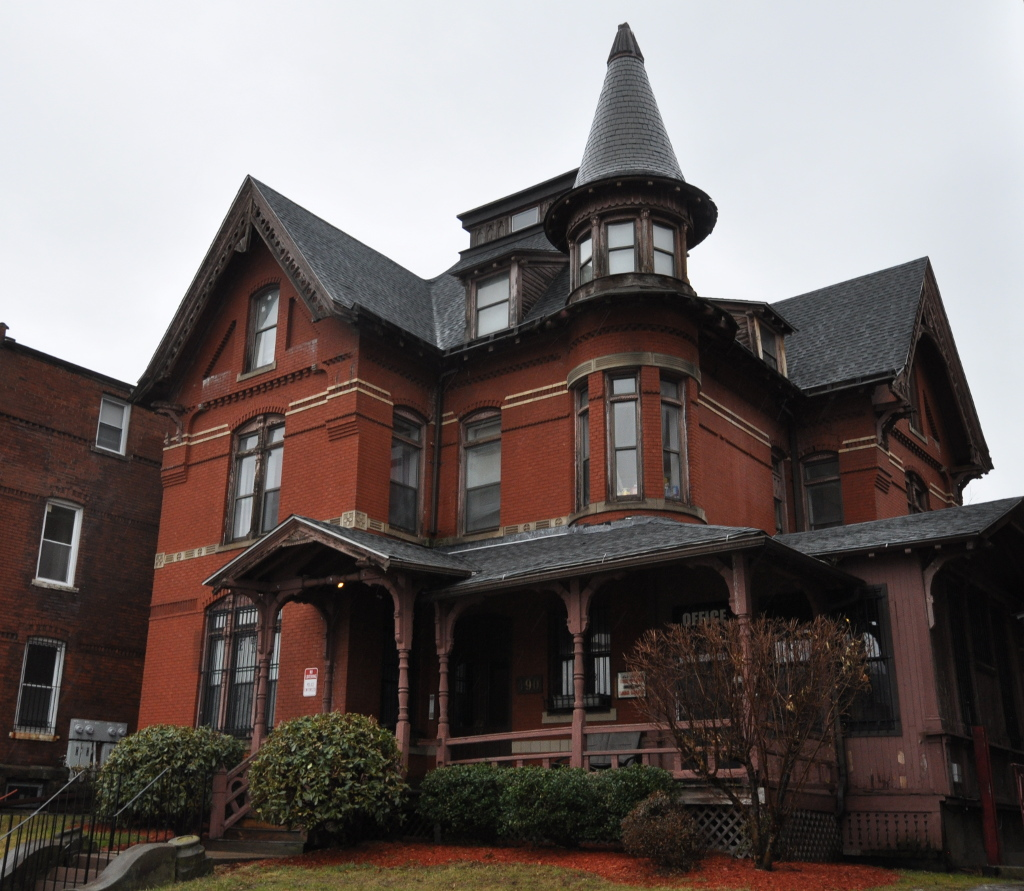

- Location within Connecticut Location within the United States
- Location: 490 Ann Uccello Street, Hartford, Connecticut
- Coordinates: 41°46′19″N 72°40′39″W
- Area: 1 acre (0.40 ha)
- Built: 1882
- Architectural style: Queen Anne, High Victorian Gothic
- Part of: Downtown North Historic District (ID04000390)
- NRHP reference No.: 82004429

Significant dates
- Added to NRHP: February 4, 1982
- Designated CP: May 6, 2004

The Arthur G. Pomeroy House is a historic house at 490 Ann Uccello Street in Hartford, Connecticut. Built in 1882 for a wealthy tobacco grower, it is a locally distinctive combination of Queen Anne and High Victorian Gothic architecture executed in brick. It was listed on the National Register of Historic Places in 1982.

== Description and history ==
The Arthur G. Pomery House is located in Hartford's Clay-Arsenal neighborhood, on the east side of Ann Uccello Street (formerly Ann Street), north of Chapel Street and Interstate 84. It is a 2 1/2-story masonry structure, built out of red brick with stone trim. Its main block is covered by a hip roof with a rectangular flat-roof monitor section at its center. This basic shape is obscured by a wealth of projecting gable sections and porches that typify the Queen Anne style. Large gables project both to the front and side, and are adorned with Gothic vergeboard. A single-story hip-roof porch extends between these two sections, wrapping around a corner turret in the process. The porch has turned posts with brackets at the top, and a low balustrade. A gabled section projects above the main stairs.

The house was built in 1882 for Arthur Pomeroy, a wealthy tobacco farmer from Suffield. At the time of its construction, the area was a quiet residential area of similar (though generally less elaborate) houses. It has since been transformed by the highway and urban renewal, with most of the housing replaced by apartment houses or commercial buildings. This house is one of the few surviving reminders of that residential past. It now houses professional offices.

== See also ==
- National Register of Historic Places listings in Hartford, Connecticut
