= Keney Tower =

- U.S. National Register of Historic Places
- U.S. Historic district – Contributing property
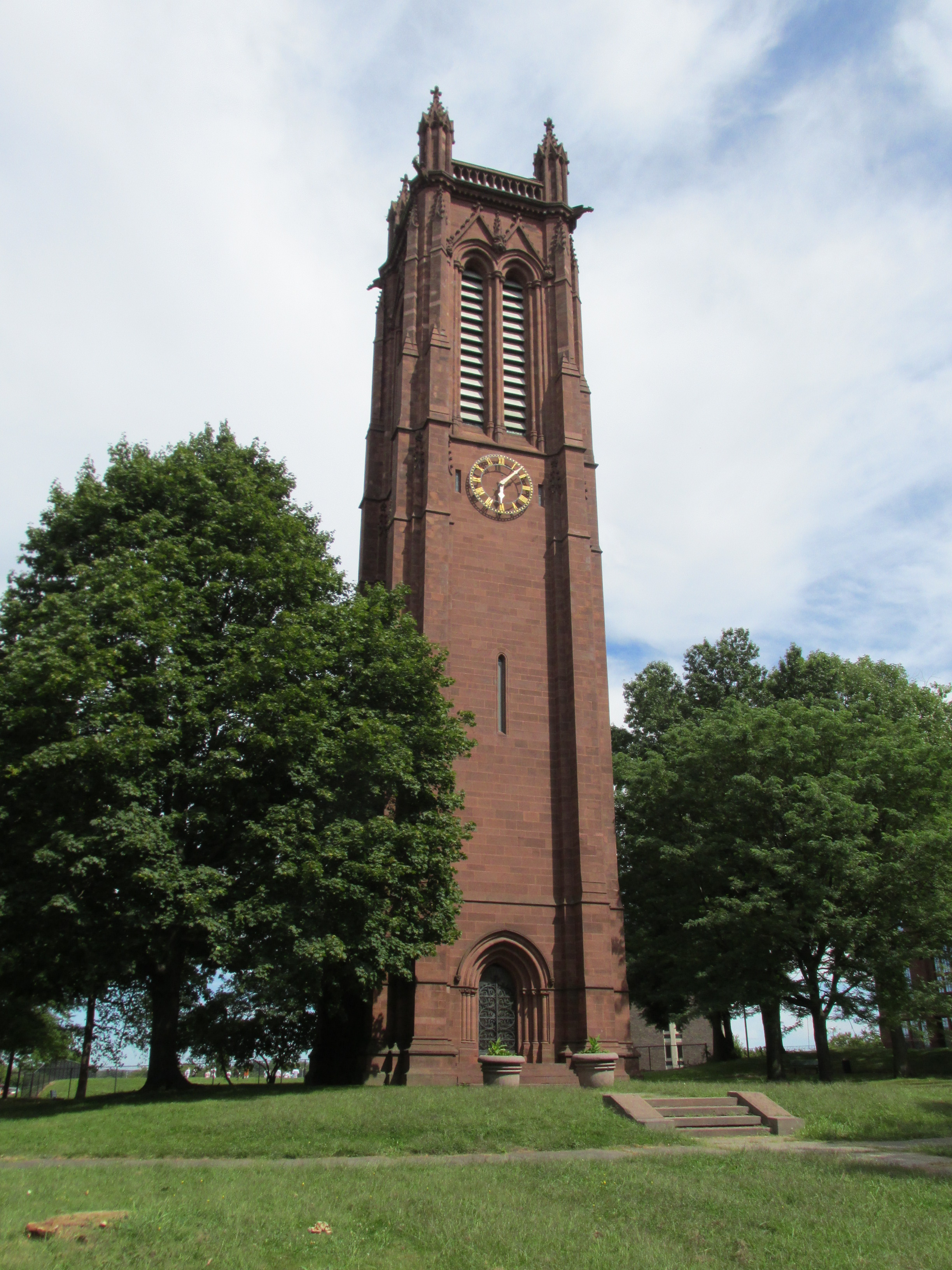

- Location within Connecticut Location within the United States
- Location: Main and Ely Streets, Hartford, Connecticut
- Coordinates: 41°46′23″N 72°40′36″W
- Area: 1.5 acres (0.61 ha)
- Built: 1898
- Architect: Haight, Charles C.
- Architectural style: Collegiate Gothic
- Part of: Downtown North Historic District (ID04000390)
- NRHP reference No.: 78002871

Significant dates
- Added to NRHP: March 30, 1978
- Designated CP: May 6, 2004

Keney Tower is a memorial tower located in a small public park at Main and Ely Streets North of Downtown Hartford, Connecticut. Built in 1898 as a memorial to family members by the locally prominent Keney family, it is a distinctive local example of Collegiate Gothic architecture, and is the city's only free-standing tower. It was listed on the National Register of Historic Places in 1978.

== Description and history ==
Keney Tower is located on the northern fringe of downtown Hartford, from which it is now separated by I-84. It is located in a park 1.5 acres (0.61 ha) in size at the southeast corner of Main and Ely Streets, in an area dominated by traffic and commercial development. The tower stands near the center of the roughly square park. Its base is 30 feet (9.1 m) square, and it rises to a height of 130 feet (40 m). It is built out of ashlar-cut red sandstone quarried in Longmeadow, Massachusetts. Its verticality is heightened by corner buttresses, and pinnacles that rise above its roof to finial crosses. There are clock faces on all four sides, above which are lancet-arched louvers around the chamber housing chiming bells that sound every quarter hour.

The tower was built in 1898 on land that belonged at the time to the locally prominent Keney family. Its construction was done by the family under the terms of the will of Henry Keney, who sought to memorialize his wholesale grocery business, H. & W. Keney. The family, however, instead placed a plaque on the tower reading "This tower erected to the memory of my mother is designed to preserve from other occupancy the ground sacred to me as her home and to stand in perpetual honor to the wisdom, goodness and womanly nobility of her to whose guidance I owe my success in life and its chief joy ~ Henry Keney". The tower was designed by New York City architect Charles C. Haight, whose specialty was Collegiate Gothic architecture. The family trust deeded the tower and park to the city in 1924.

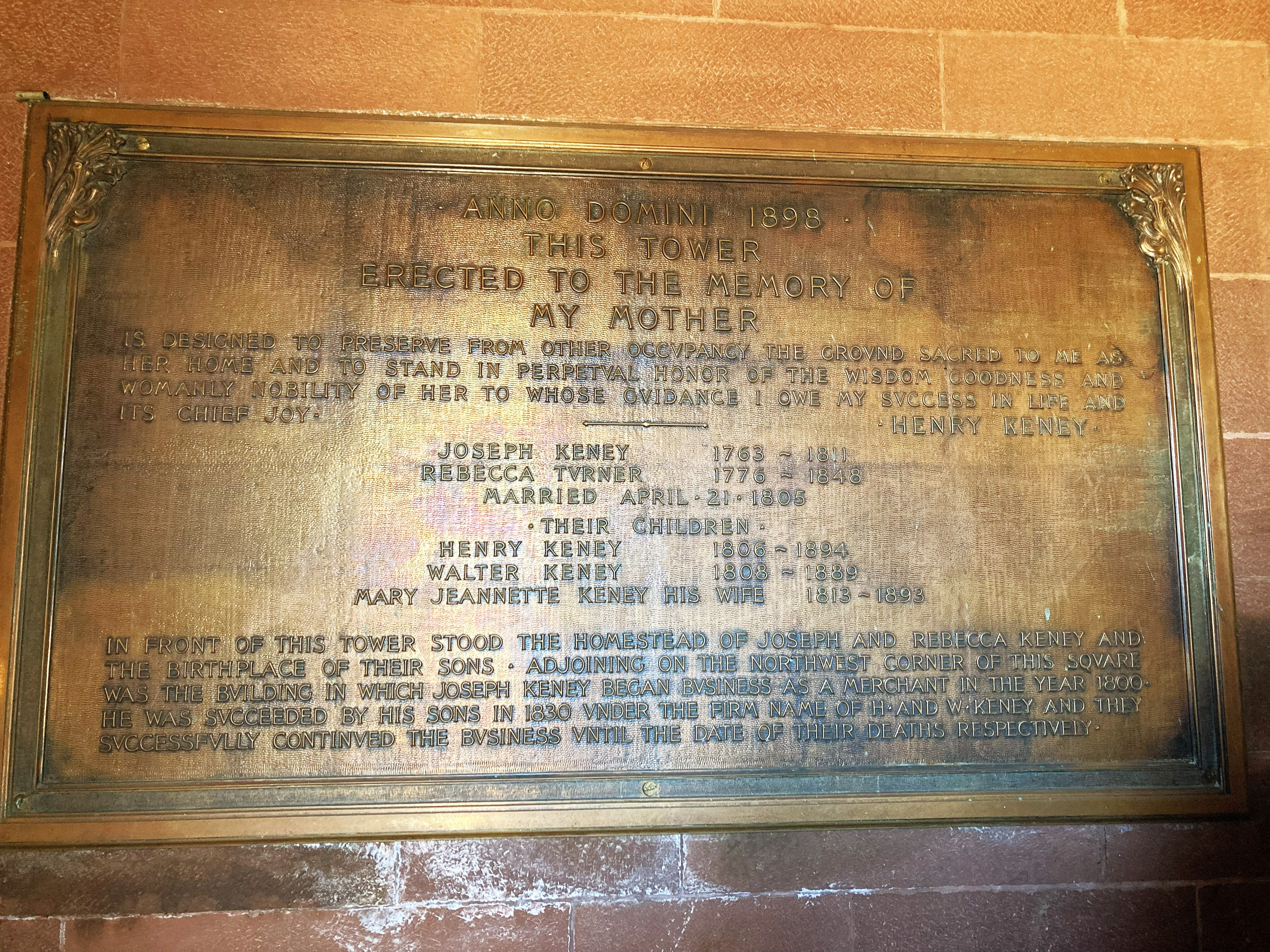

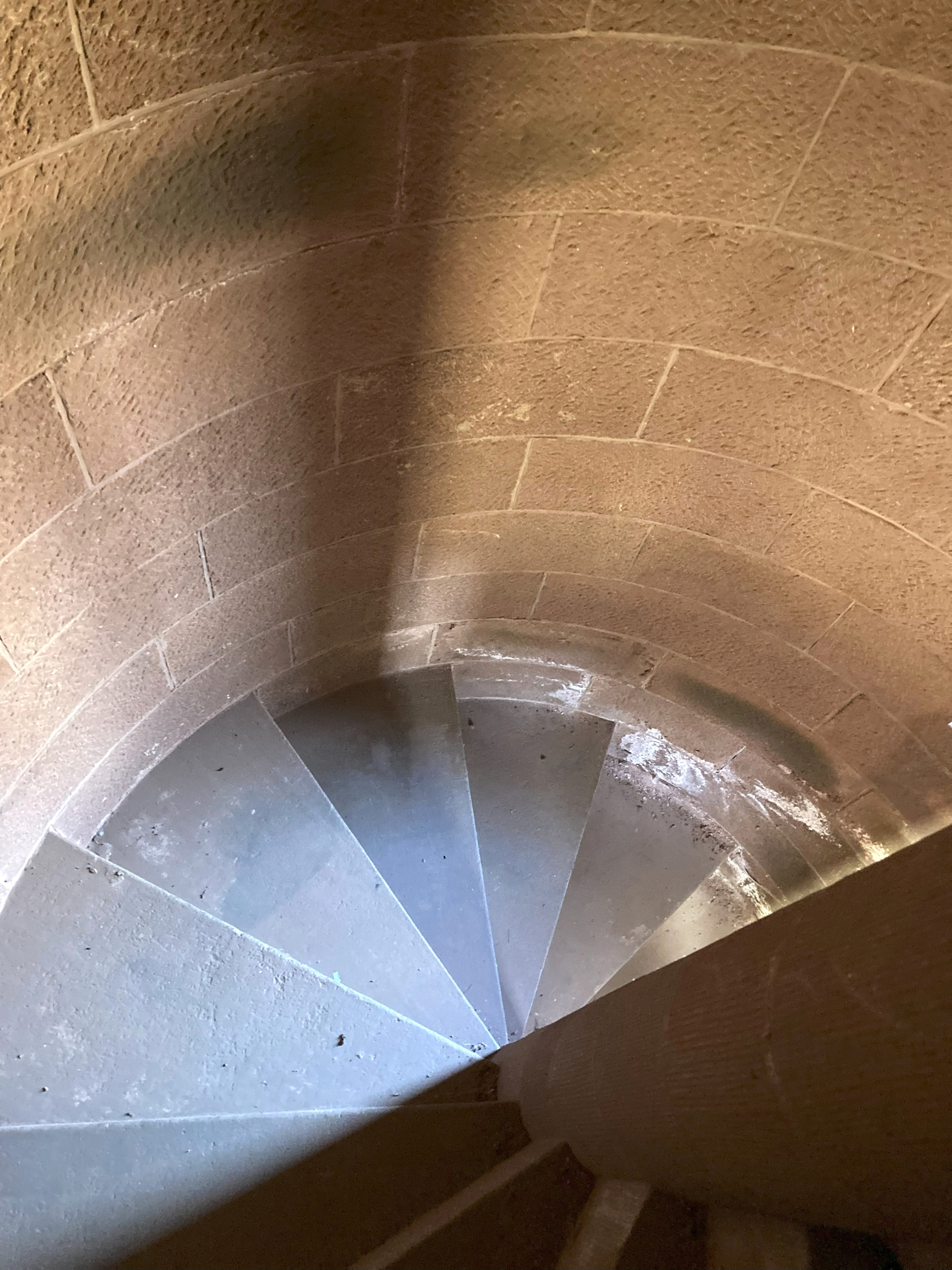

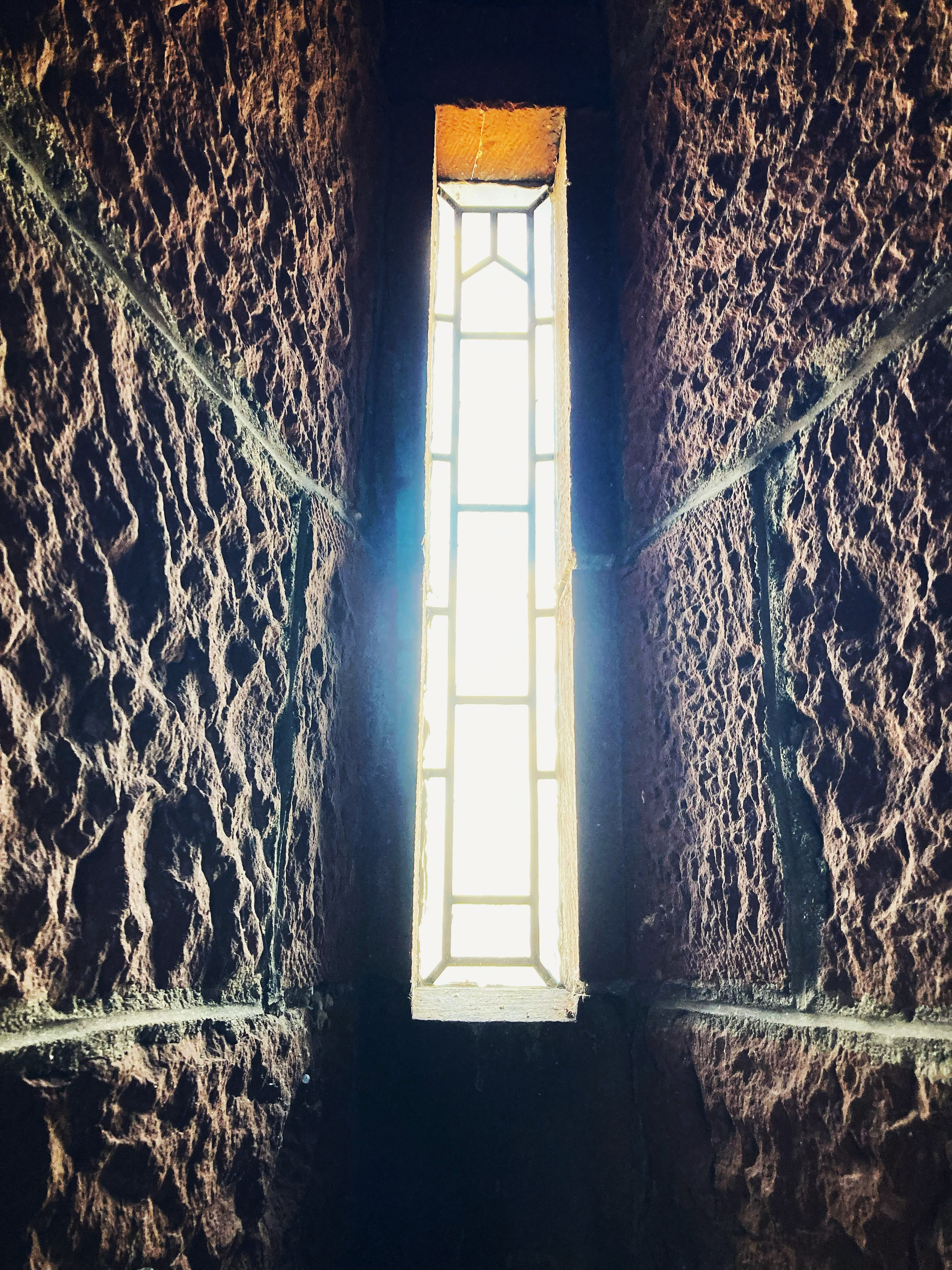

== See also ==
- National Register of Historic Places listings in Hartford, Connecticut
