= Mirabito Stadium =

Stadium in Binghamton, New York, US

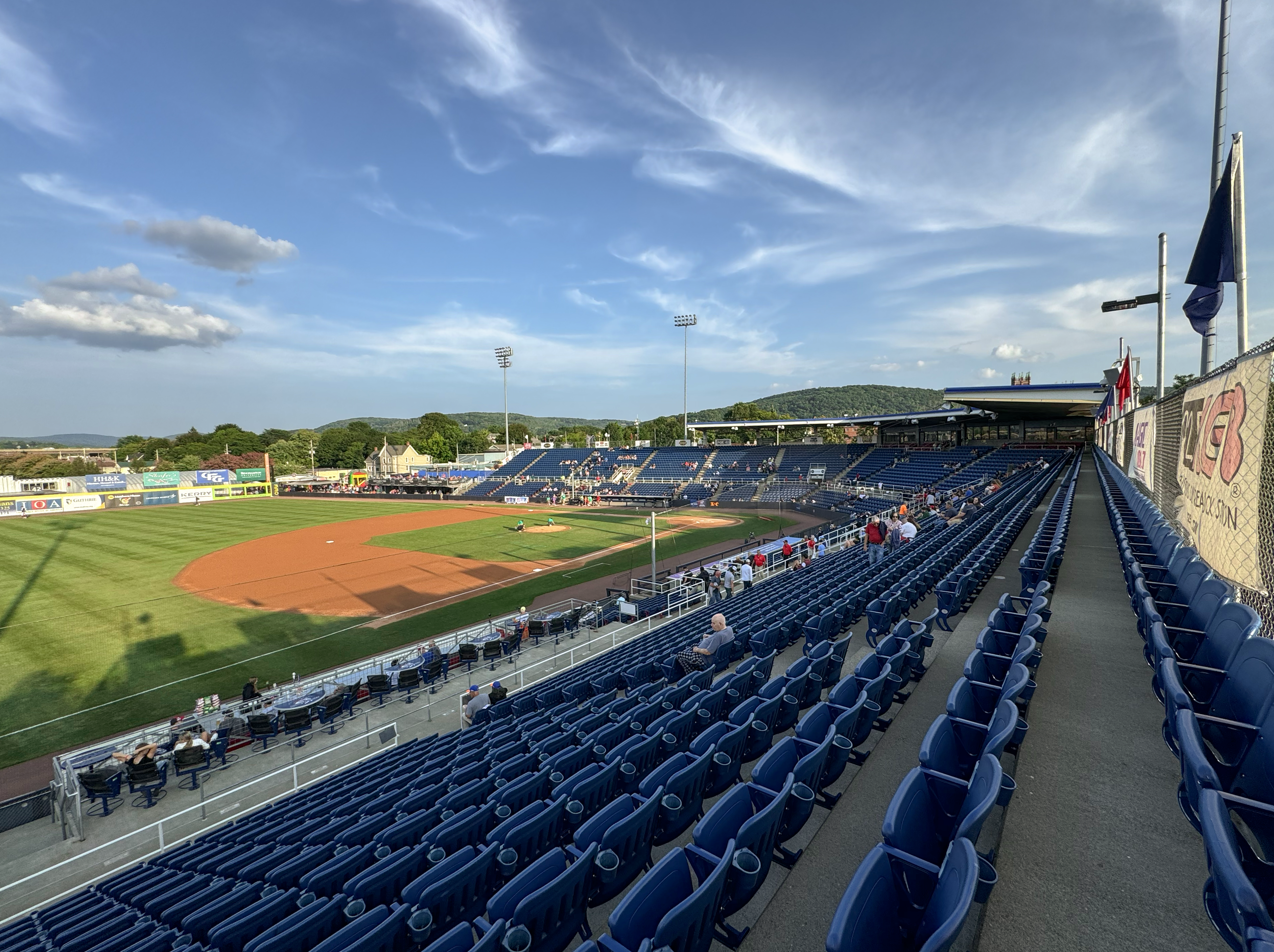

- Location within New York Location within the United States
- Interactive map of Mirabito Stadium
- Former names: Binghamton Municipal Stadium (1992–2001); NYSEG Stadium (2001–2021)
- Address: 211 Henry Street; Binghamton, New York 13901
- Coordinates: 42.102769°N 75.904988°W
- Owner: City of Binghamton
- Operator: Binghamton Baseball Club, Inc.
- Capacity: 6,012
- Surface: Grass
- Record attendance: 7,491
- Field size: Left Field: 330 feet (100 m); Center Field: 400 feet (120 m); Right Field: 330 feet (100 m)

Construction
- Groundbreaking: July 19, 1991
- Opened: April 14, 1992
- Cost: $4.6 million ($10.6 million in 2025 dollars)
- Architect: Highland Associates
- General contractor: Garbade Construction Corp.

Tenant
- Binghamton Rumble Ponies (EL) 1992–present

Mirabito Stadium (formerly known as Binghamton Municipal Stadium and NYSEG Stadium) is a stadium located in the northern section of downtown Binghamton, New York. It is home to the Binghamton Rumble Ponies of the Eastern League. Construction began in July 1991 after it was announced that the Williamsport Bills would be moving from Williamsport, Pennsylvania. The ballpark opened the following season, in April 1992, and has a seating capacity of 6,012 fans.

The stadium is named for Mirabito Energy Products, a local chain of gas stations and convenience stores, and was given the name in 2021.

== Features ==
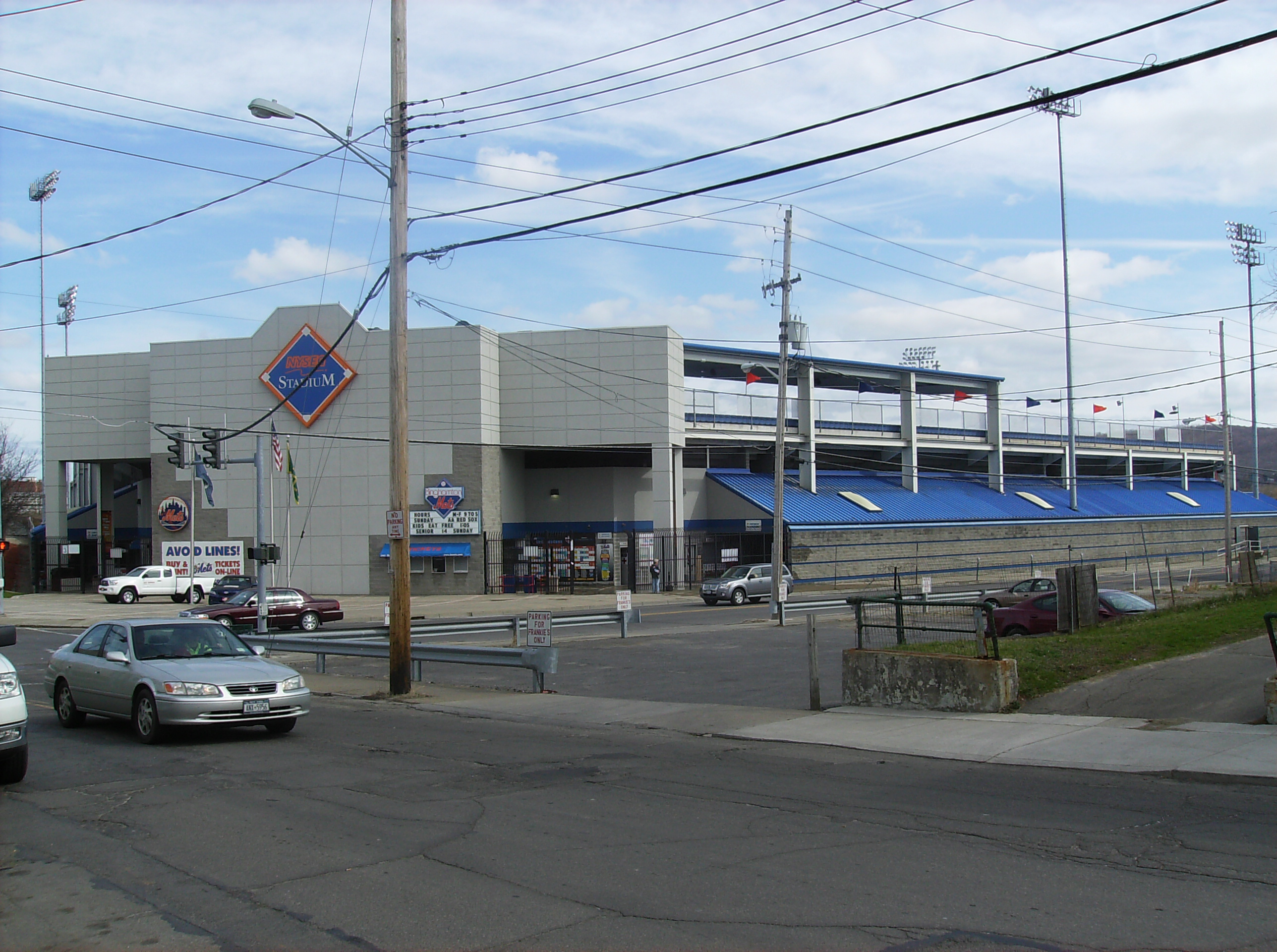
Stadium exterior in 2007

The stadium is a split-level construction, with a concourse running around the middle of the seating area. The lower section closest to the field (8–10 rows) is all box seats; above the concourse, the first few rows around home plate are also considered box seats. The rest of the upper section is "reserved grandstand" seating. All seats are blue chair-back models. Six luxury boxes and the press box are located at the top of the seating bowl behind home plate. A small roof covers the luxury boxes and the top few rows of the grandstand seats.

Four tunnels allow access between the seating area and the concourse which runs underneath. This is where concessions and restrooms are located. There is also a group picnic area down the left-field line which can be rented out, as well as "Lupo's Dugout", another picnic area in right field which is sponsored by a local restaurant.

The stadium was known as simply Binghamton Municipal Stadium for its first nine years of existence, but in March 2001, the naming rights were sold for 20 years to New York State Electric and Gas (NYSEG), the local electric and gas utility. In 2021, after NYSEG's agreement had expired, the naming rights were sold to Mirabito Energy Products.

== Notable events ==
On July 11, 1994, the ballpark hosted the Double-A All-Star Game in which a team of American League-affiliated All-Stars defeated a team of National League-affiliated All-Stars, 10–4, before 6,543 people in attendance.

The Mets' Bob Keppel pitched the first no-hitter in franchise history at NYSEG Stadium on August 2, 2003.

A record crowd of 7,491 gathered to watch Max Scherzer throw a rehab assignment for the Double-AA Binghamton Rumble Ponies on June 21, 2022. Scherzer struck out six over 3 1/3 innings, giving up two earned runs.

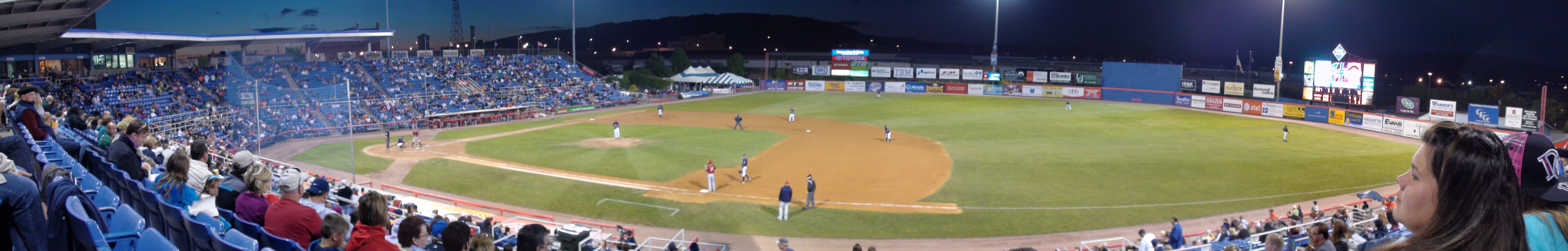
The Binghamton Mets on the field against the Harrisburg Senators in September 2010
