= Downtown North Historic District (Hartford, Connecticut) =

Historic district in Connecticut, United States

- U.S. National Register of Historic Places
- U.S. Historic district
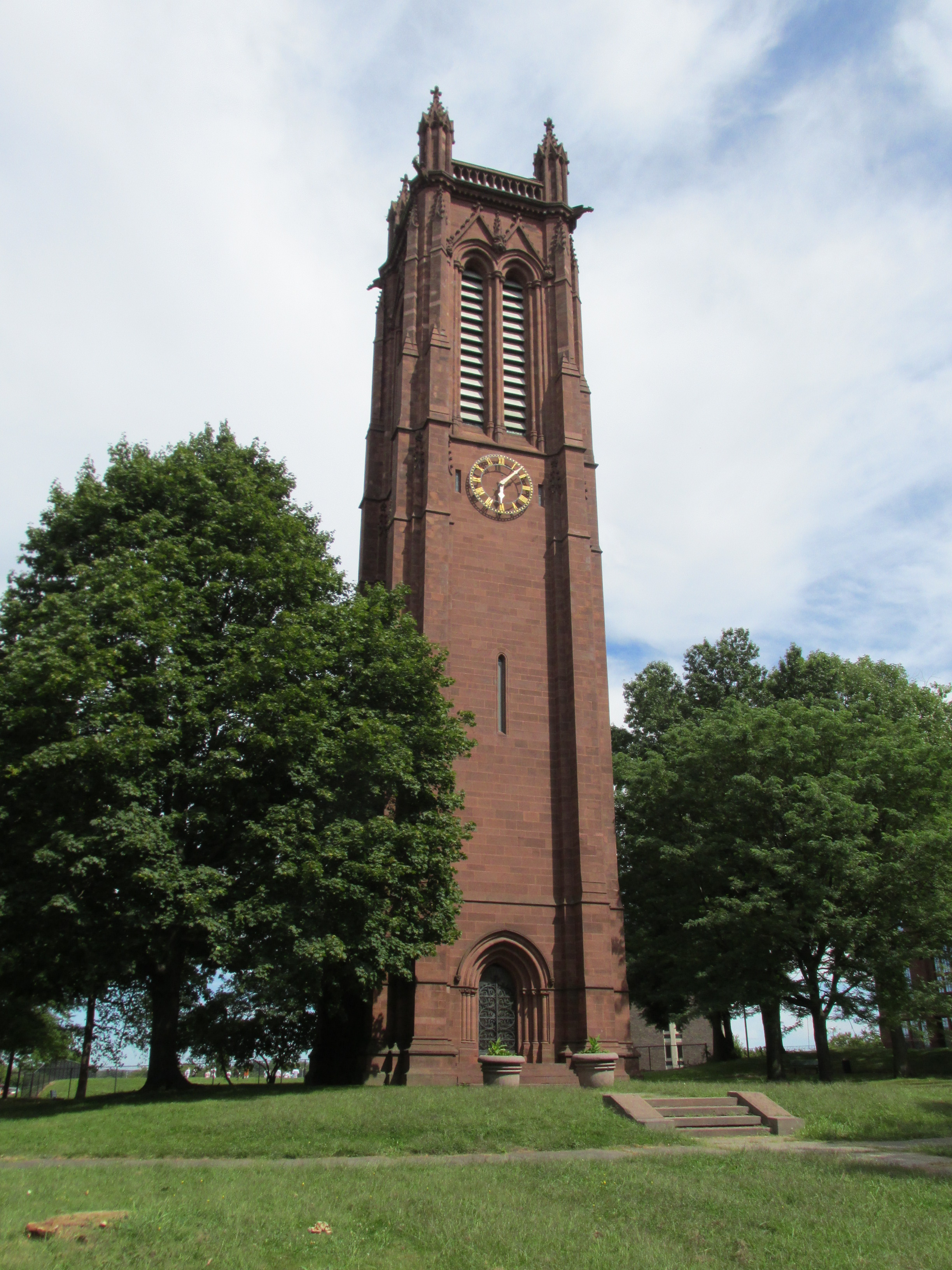
- Keney Tower

- Location within Connecticut Location within the United States
- Location: Roughly Ann, Atlant, Ely, High, Main and Pleasant Streets, Hartford, Connecticut
- Coordinates: 41°46′19″N 72°40′38″W
- Area: 19 acres (7.7 ha)
- Built: 1891
- Architect: Allen, William G.
- Architectural style: Mid 19th Century Revival, Late Victorian
- NRHP reference No.: 04000390
- Added to NRHP: May 6, 2004

The Downtown North Historic District is a 19-acre (7.7 ha) historic district in Hartford, Connecticut. It is a predominantly residential area located around Main Street and High Street North of I-84 and south of the Amtrak Railroad Tracks. Its apartment blocks, houses, schools and churches, built up mainly in the late 19th and early 20th centuries as part of an expansion of the city's urban core. It includes the 130-foot (40 m) Keney Tower. The area was listed on the National Register of Historic Places in 2004.

== Description and history ==
Hartford's Downtown North Historic District is a roughly butterfly-shaped area, bounded on north by the Amtrak railroad tracks and centered on the Junction of Albany Avenue with Main, High, Ely, and Ann Uccello Streets. The wings of the butterfly are located on either side of this junction, the left wing bounded on the south by Interstate 84 and Walnut Street, and the right wing bounded on the south by Winthrop Street. The eastern wing is dominated in size by the grounds of the former Barnard School, built in 1927 and now home to the Capital Preparatory Magnet School, with the Keney Tower park just to its north. The tower, a freestanding Gothic Revival structure designed by Charles C. Haight and built in 1898, is a memorial to the locally prominent Keney family, whose home and business were here. North of the tower is the Sacred Heart Church, a brick Gothic Revival church built in 1892. Across Main Street from the school are a row of Italianate duplex residences, built in the 1890s.

At the triangular junction between Ann Uccello and High Streets is a "Flatiron" building, 105 feet (32 m) in height, built in 1896 to a design by Frederick Comstock. South of that building on Ann Uccello Street are a series of residential buildings, some single-family and some multiunit. The most elaborate is the Arthur G. Pomeroy House, a fine Queen Anne Victorian built in 1882. On the west side of High Street stands the Isham-Terry House, a c. 1854 Italianate villa that is now a historic house museum, and the Classical Revival Second North District School, built in 1891 and now housing the city's board of education. The area just to its south was a residential area when the district was listed in 2004, but that has been razed and is now occupied by the city's police headquarters.

== See also ==
- National Register of Historic Places listings in Hartford, Connecticut
