= Model (disambiguation) =

A model is an informative representation of an object, person or system, and serves as a substitute for the original. For example:

- Machine learning model, a type of a mathematical model of a concrete system in the context of machine learning
- Model (person), a human representing, or to be imitated by, other humans, e.g. in art or commercial advertising

Model may also refer to:

== Film and television ==
- Model (TV series), a 1997 South Korean television series
- Model (film), a 1981 American documentary film by Frederick Wiseman
- The Model (film), a 2016 Danish thriller drama film
- Models, a 1999 Austrian drama film by Ulrich Seidl

== Literature ==
- Model (manhwa), a 1999 series by Lee So-young
- The Model, a 2005 novel by Lars Saabye Christensen

== Music ==
- Model (band), a Turkish rock band
- Models (band), an Australian rock band
- The Models, an English punk rock band
- "Model" (Gulddreng song), 2016
- "Das Model", a 1978 song by Kraftwerk
- Model (album), a 2024 album by Wallows
- Models (album), a 2023 album by Lee Gamble
- "Model", a 1994 song by Avail from Dixie
- "Model", a 2015 song by Before You Exit
- "Model", a 1991 song by Simply Red from Stars

== People ==
- Model (surname), a surname frequently of Central European and occasionally English origins
- The Model (wrestler), ring name of Rick Martel (born 1956)
- Eddie Taubensee (born 1968), baseball player nicknamed "The Model"
- Walter Model German WW2 General

== Places ==
- Model, Colorado, an unincorporated town in the United States
- Model, Masovian Voivodeship, a village in central Poland

== Other uses ==
- MODEL, Movement for Democracy in Liberia, a rebel group

== See also ==
- Modell (disambiguation)
- Modelo (disambiguation)
- Model City (disambiguation)
- Model School (disambiguation)
- Model Town (disambiguation)
- Mathematical model, an abstract description of a concrete system using mathematical concepts and language
  - Computer model, the running of a mathematical model on a computer
- 3D modeling, the process of creating an object in computer graphics
- Scientific modelling, minimizing a complex system to better be able to solve problems
- Model theory, the study of classes of mathematical structures
- Modeling (NLP), the process of adopting the behaviors, language, strategies and beliefs of another person or exemplar
- Modeling (psychology), learning by imitating or observing a person's behavior
- Remodeling (disambiguation)
- Miniature faking, a photograph made to look like a photograph of a scale model
- Fluid mosaic model the proposal that biological cell walls consist of a double layer of non-rigid biomolecules
- Model lipid bilayer, an artificial chemical reconstruction of a biological cell wall
- Model Automobile Company, an early vehicle manufacturer in Peru, Indiana
- Models (painting) or Les Poseuses, a c.1887 work by Georges Seurat
- Soho walk-up, a type of apartment for prostitution signposted "model"
