= Renovator (disambiguation) =

Renovator may refer to:

- renovator is a person that carries out a renovation.
- The Renovators (TV series) a renovation based Australian TV game show

== Political parties ==
The Renovators' may refer to:

- Renovator Movement (Spanish: Movimiento Renovador), a Salvadoran political party
- Renovator Labour Party (Portuguese: Partido Trabalhista Renovador, PTR), a Brazilian political party
- National Renovator Party (Portuguese: Partido Nacional Renovador), a political party of Portugal
- Civic Renovator Party (Spanish: Partido Cívico Renovador, PCR), a political party of the Dominican Republic
- Democratic Renovator Party (disambiguation)

== See also ==
- Renovate Now (French: Rénover maintenant), a political block of France in the Socialist Party
- Renovation (disambiguation)
