= Modelo =

Modelo, a Spanish word for model, may refer to:

== Places ==
- Modelo, Santa Catarina, a city in Brazil
- Modelo Formation, a geologic formation in southern California, U.S.
- Modelo Group, a geologic group in Mexico

== Companies ==
- El Modelo, a restaurant in Albuquerque, New Mexico, U.S.
- Grupo Modelo, a brewery in Mexico
- Modelo Brewery, a brewery in Cuba
- Modelo Continente, a Portuguese hypermarket chain owned by Continente

== Music ==
- "La Modelo" (Ozuna song), 2017
- "La Modelo", a song by José Capmany

== Structures ==
- Mercado Modelo (disambiguation)
- Modelo Market, a handicraft market in Salvador, Bahia, Brazil
- Modelo Museum of Science and Industry, Toluca, Mexico

=== Prisons ===
- La Modelo, Bogota, Colombia
- Cárcel Modelo, Madrid, Spain
- Presidio Modelo, Nueva Gerona, Cuba

== See also ==
- Las modelos (disambiguation)
- Model (disambiguation)
