= Modell =

Modell is the German word for "model" and also a surname. It may refer to:

== People ==
- Arnold Modell (1924–2022), American professor of social psychiatry
- Art Modell (1925–2012), American business executive and sports team owner
- Bernadette Modell, (born 1935), British geneticist
- David Modell (1961–2017), American business executive and sports team owner
- Frank Modell (1917-2016), American cartoonist
- Merriam Modell (1908–1994), American author of pulp fiction
- Pat Modell (1931–2011), American TV actress
- Rod Modell, given name for Deepchord, electronic music producer from Detroit, Michigan
- William Modell (1921–2008), American businessman and chairman of Modell's Sporting Goods

== Companies ==
- Modell's Sporting Goods, a sporting goods retailer based in New York City
- Schabak Modell, a die-cast toy producer in Germany
- Schuco Modell, a die-cast toy producer in Germany

== Media and entertainment ==
- "Das Modell", a song recorded by the electro-pop group Kraftwerk
- Modell Bianka, a 1951 East German film

== Other uses ==
- Berliner Modell, a learning theory
- Modell M and Modell S, types of Mauser bolt-action rifles
- V-Modell, a software development model
- Modell Number, measure of wear resistance in steel

== See also ==
- Model (disambiguation)
- Modella, Victoria, a rural locality in Australia
- Micky Modelle, a music DJ and producer
- Modello, the Italian word for "model" or preparatory study for a work of art
