= Model City =

A model city is a city built to a high standard and intended as a model for others to imitate. The term was first used in 1854.

Model city may specifically refer to:

- Model City, Florida, also known as Liberty City, a neighborhood of Miami
- Model City, New York, a hamlet in Lewiston

== See also ==
- Model (disambiguation)
- Model Town (disambiguation)
- Model village, a type of community
- Model Colony, Karachi, a neighborhood in Pakistan
- Model Housing Estate, a residential area in Hong Kong
- Miniature park, a scale model of a settlement
- Model Cities Program, an element of US President Lyndon Johnson's Great Society and War on Poverty
- List of planned cities
