= Standard (1912 automobile) =

Defunct American motor vehicle manufacturer

Standard, Standard Eight
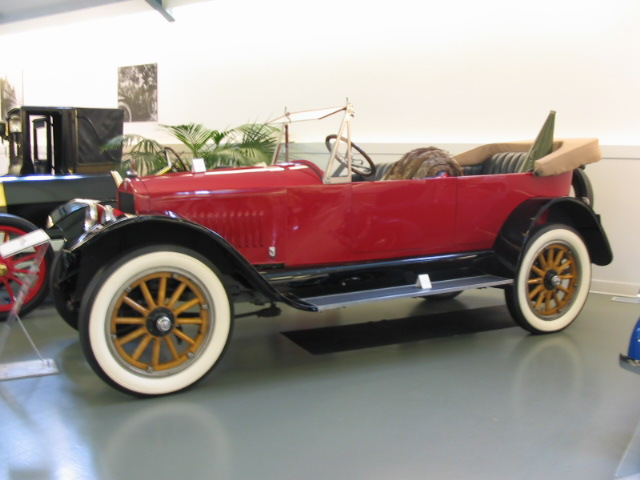
- 1917 Standard Eight Touring Car

Overview
- Manufacturer: Standard Steel Car Company
- Production: 1914–1923
- Assembly: Butler, Pennsylvania

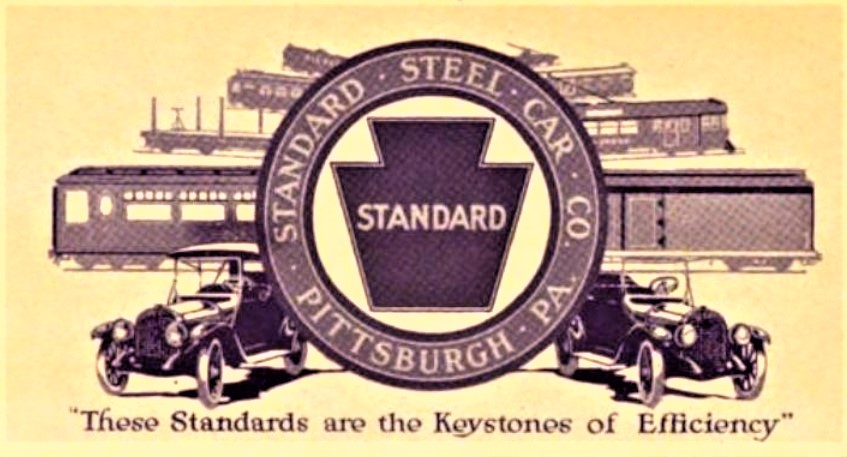
1915 Standard Steel logo from advertisement

The Standard was an American automobile manufactured in Butler, Pennsylvania from 1914 until 1923 by the Standard Steel Car Company.

== History ==
Standard Steel Car Company, whose primary business was railroad rolling stock, announced in the summer of 1913 that a new $2,000,000 factory was nearing completion for the production of automobiles. The first Standard was a six-cylinder which began limited production in early 1914. This was joined by an eight-cylinder in 1915. This was a 29-hp engine of 4.6-liters and was joined by a 34-hp V-8 in 1917. In 1918 both engines were replaced by a larger 5.2-liter V-8 of 70-hp. "Monarch of the Mountains" became a company slogan, later replaced with the tagline "A Powerful Car".

From 1917, only the 70-hp eight-cylinder cars were produced. All cars were given a twenty-five mile road test in the Butler area before distribution. In 1916 Standard Steel purchased the Model Gas Engine Company factory and assets to expand production.

Standard's best year was 1917 when about 2,300 cars were built. The standard Eight was initially a mid-priced car growing annually until by 1920, the lowest priced Standard Eight Touring Car was $3,000, (equivalent to $48,214 in 2025) with the limousine model luxury car priced at $4,300, equivalent to $69,107 in 2025.

The Post-World War I recession and Depression of 1920-21 hurt Standard Steel Car Company and in January 1921, bankers from New York joined Standard Steel, which included Don C. McCurd, formerly with American Mercedes, Flanders and Willys. In 1923 Standard Steel Car Company divested itself of any interest in the Standard automobile and McCurd reorganized the automobile division as the Standard Motor Car Company. McCurd announced the Standard Eight and a new lower priced four-cylinder model would be produced, but the four-cylinder never arrived, and the Standard Eight production ceased by year's end.

The factory in which Standard cars had been built was sold six years later and a new car called the American Austin was built there.

== Models Gallery ==
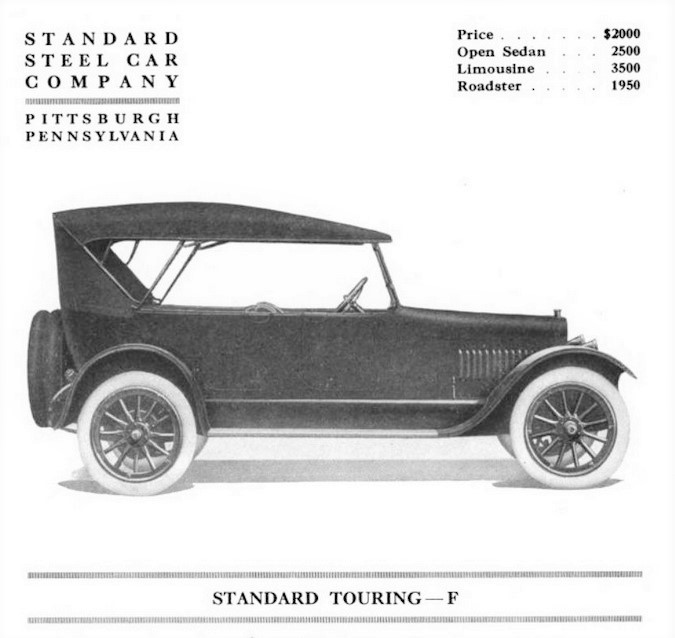
1917 Standard Eight Model F Touring Car

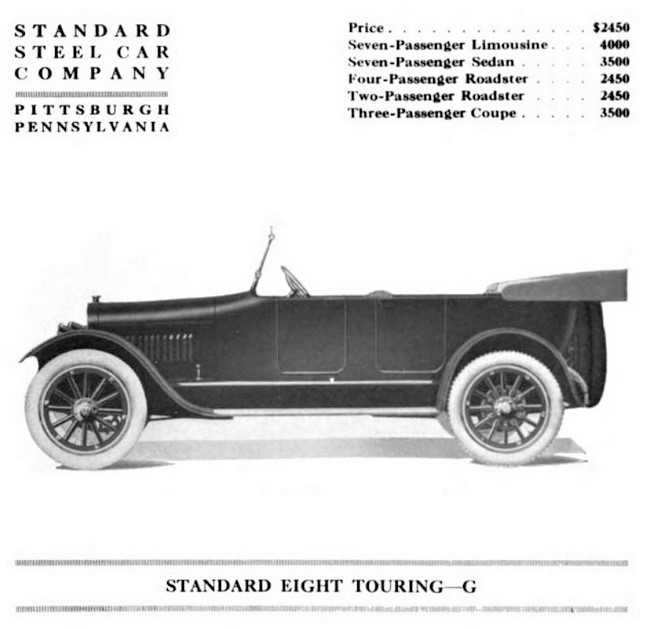
1918 Standard Eight Model G Touring Car

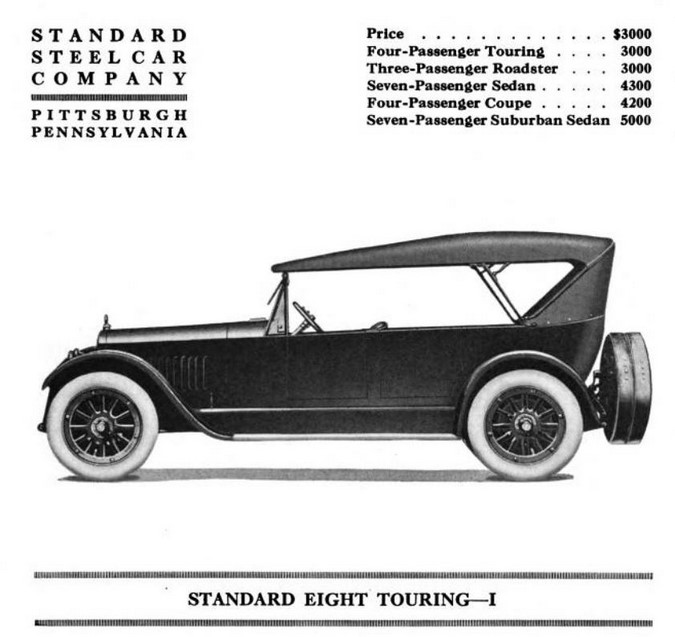
1919 Standard Eight Model I Touring Car

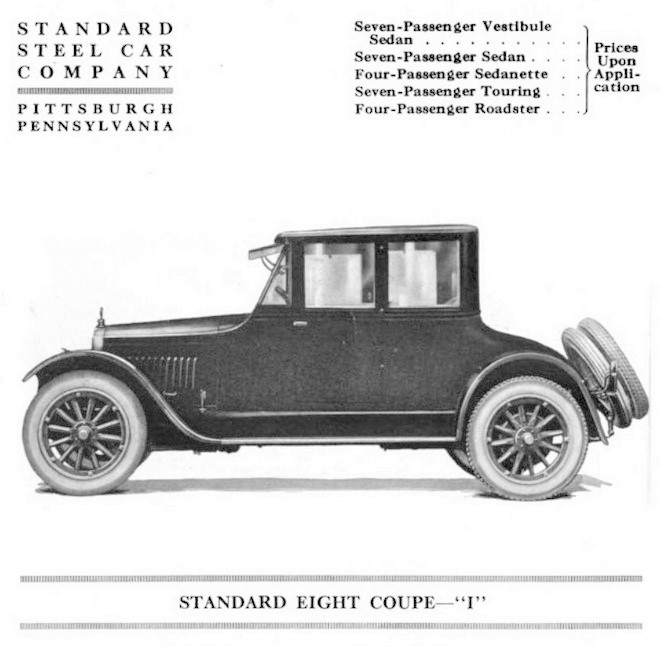
1920 and 1921 Standard Eight Model I Coupe

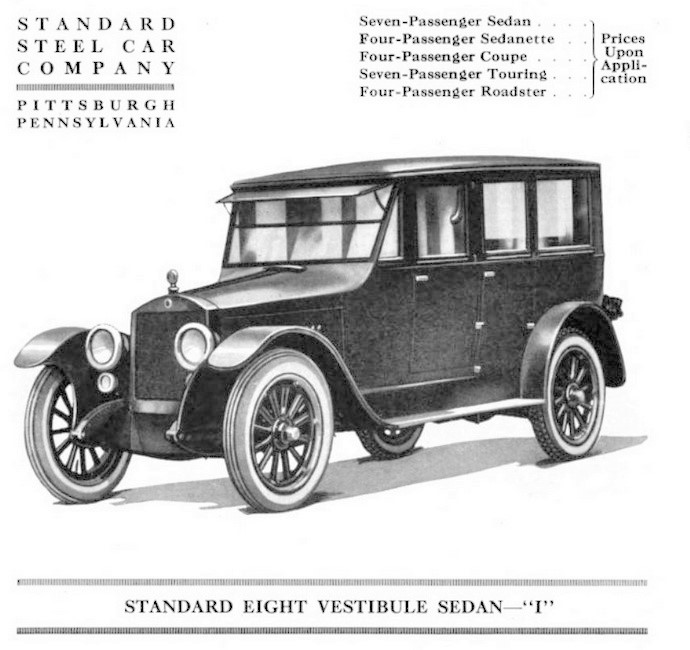
1920 and 1921 Standard Eight Model I Vestibule Sedan

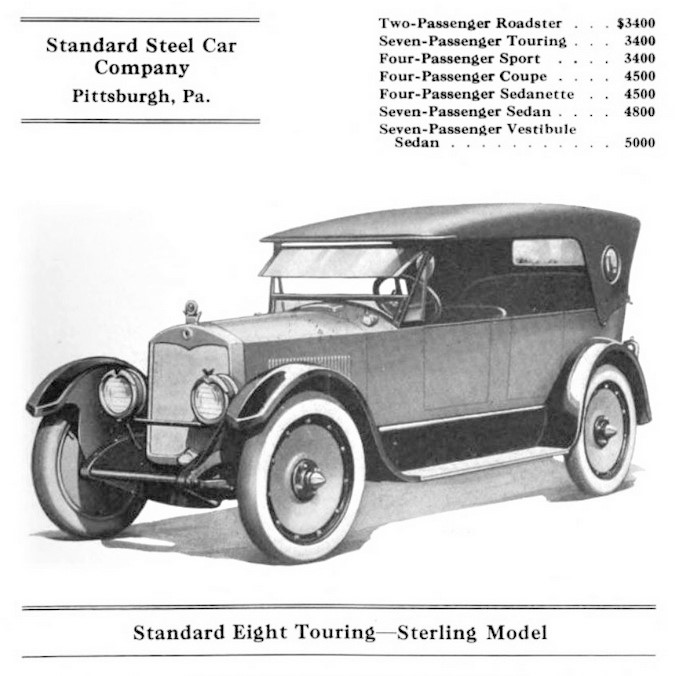
1922 and 1923 Standard Eight Touring - Sterling Model

== Production ==
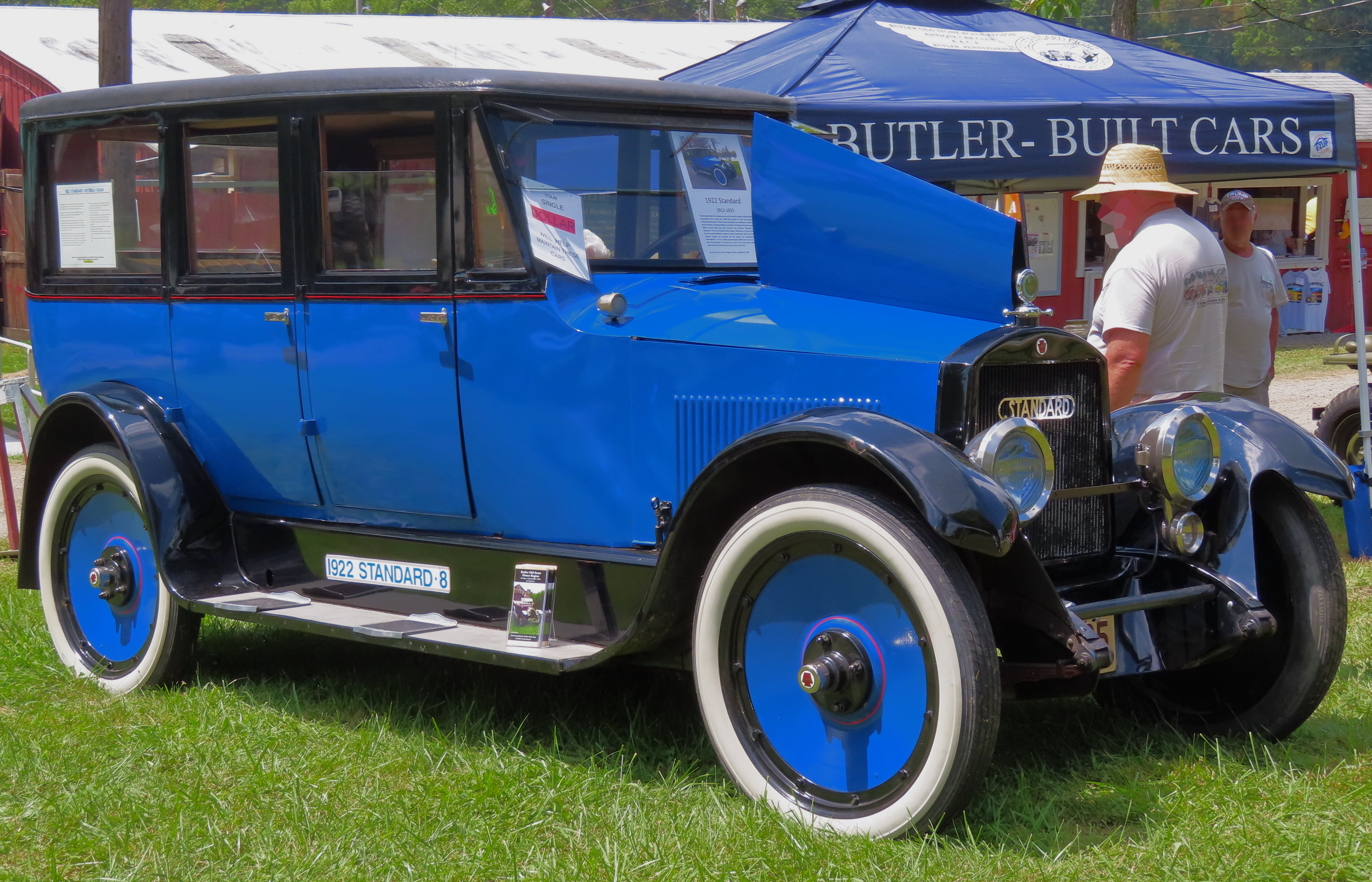
1922 Standard Eight Vestibule Sedan - front right

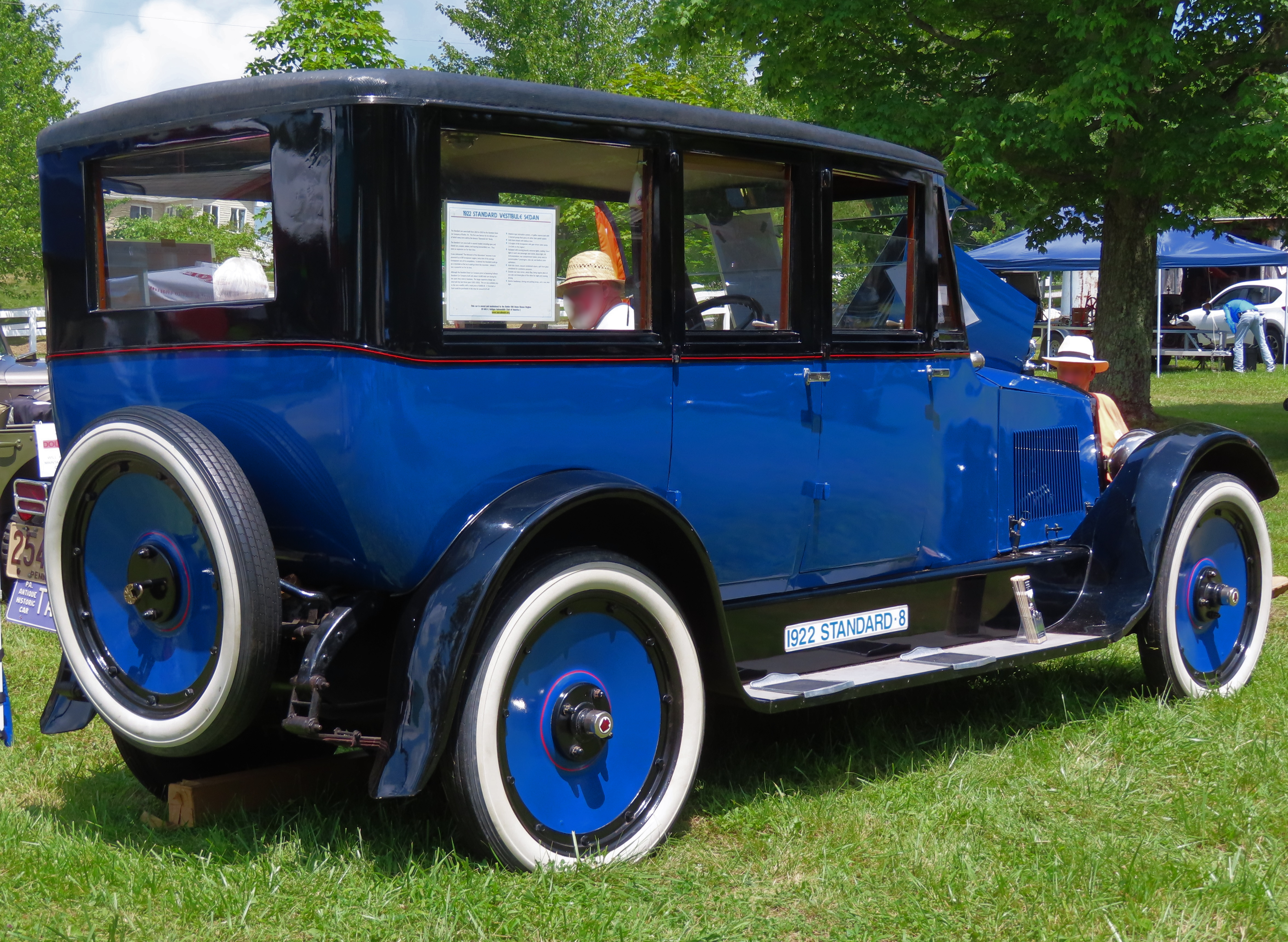
1922 Standard Eight Vestibule Sedan - rear right

Annual automobile production

Year	Production
1915	1,133
1916	1,536
1917	2,318
1918	2,123
1919	1,115
1920	2,128
1921	2,210
1922	1,216
1923	483
Total	14,262

== Advertisements ==
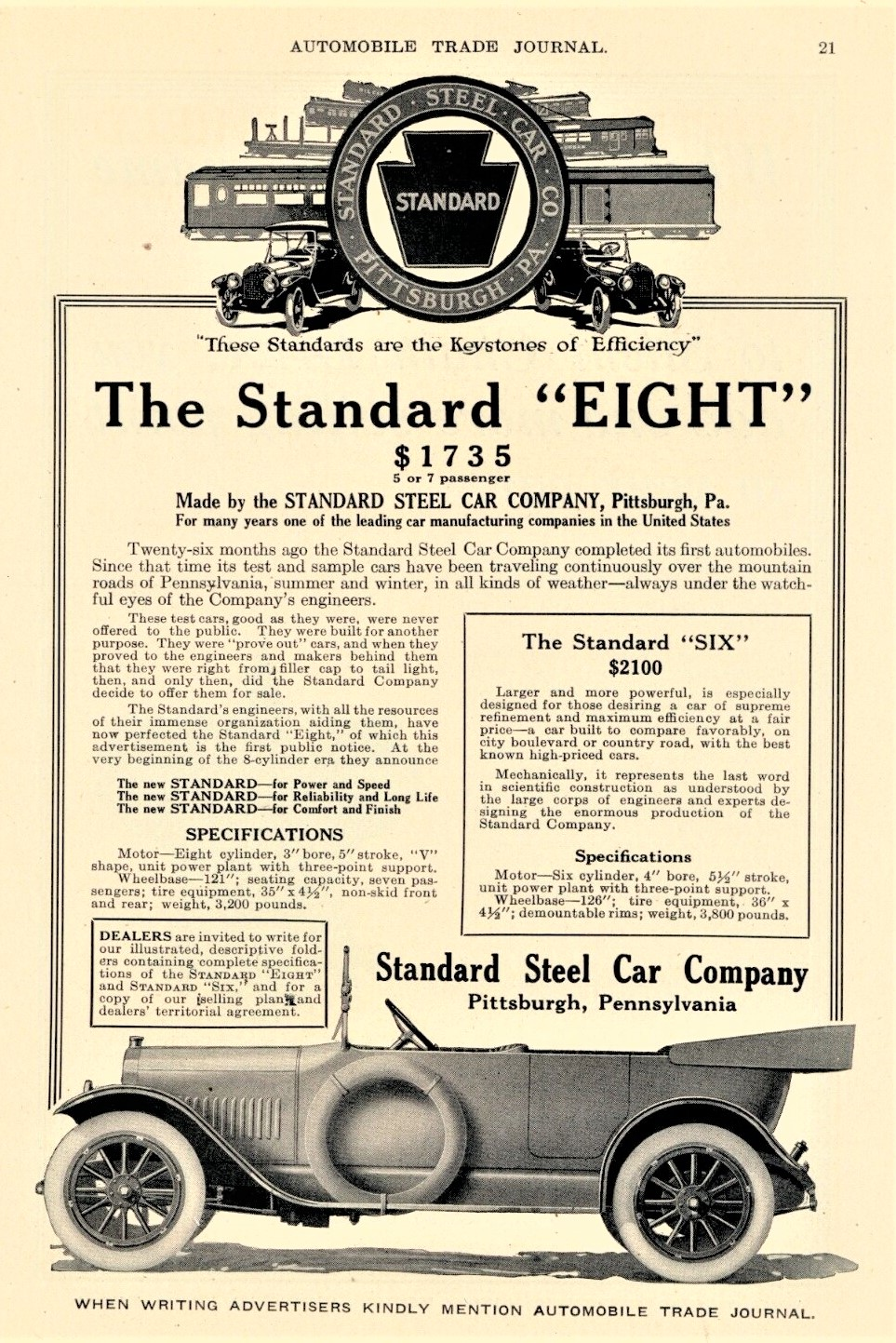
1915 Standard Eight and Six advertisement

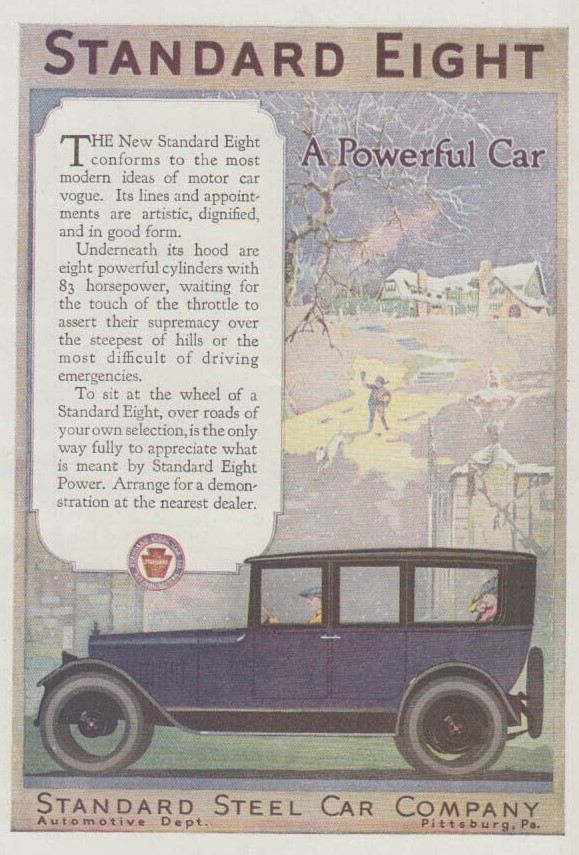
1919 Standard Eight advertisement

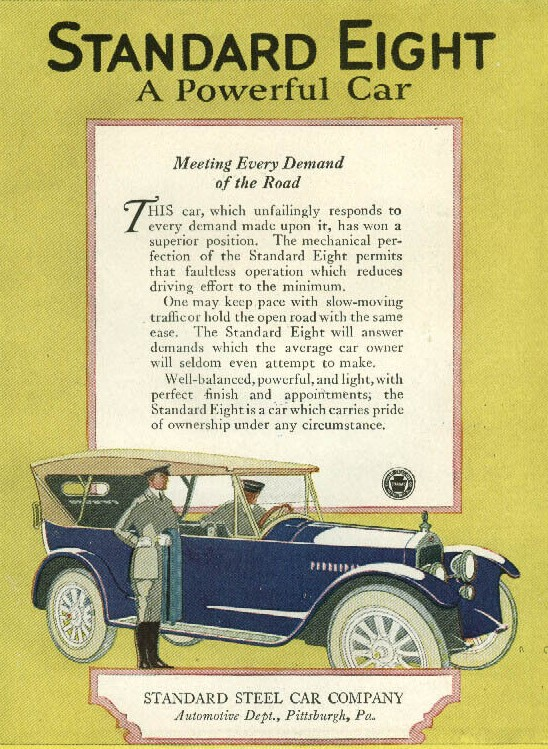
1920 Standard Eight advertisement

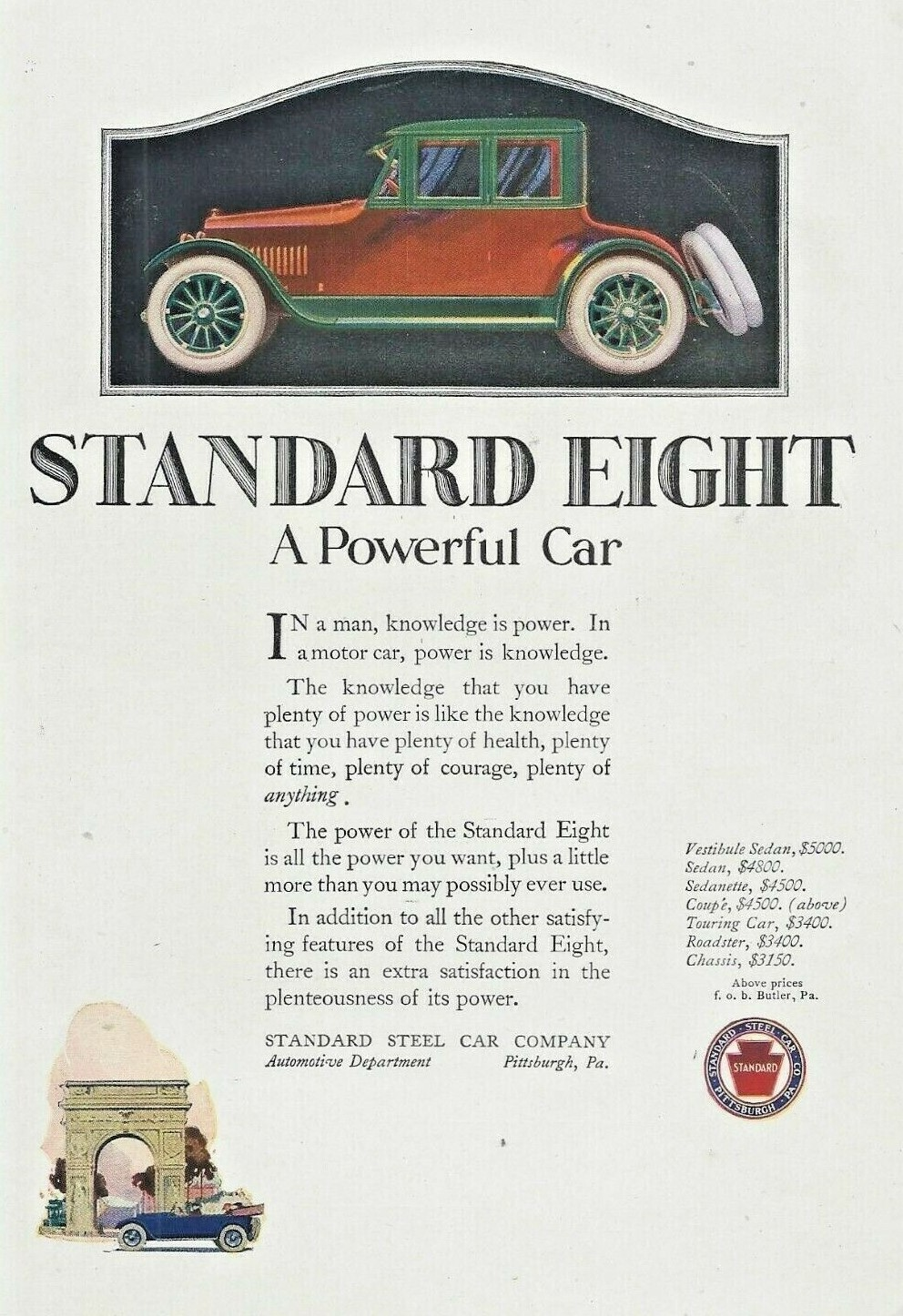
1921 Standard Eight advertisement

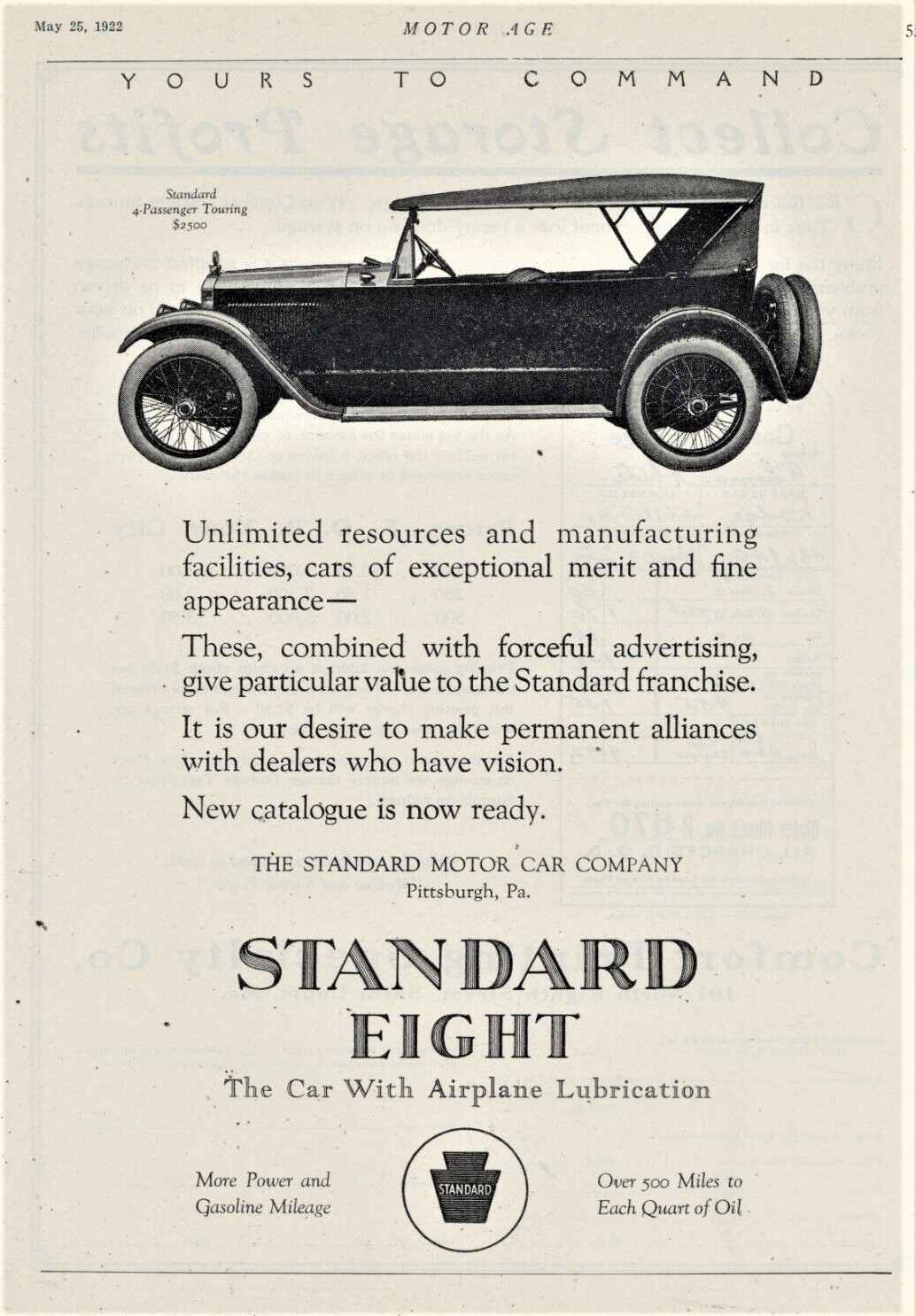
1922 Standard Eight advertisement
