= Democratic Renovator Party =

Democratic Renovator Party can refer to:

- Democratic Renewal Party (Angola)
- Democratic Renovator Party (Portugal)

== See also ==
- Renovation (disambiguation)
- Democratic Party (disambiguation)
