= Renovation (disambiguation) =

Renovation is the process of improving a structure.

Renovation may also refer to:

- Renovation (convention), the 69th World Science Fiction Convention held in Reno, Nevada, in 2011
- Renovation Products, a distributor of Japanese video games in North America during the early 1990s
- The Renovation, a 2020 Finnish comedy film
- Renovation, Inc. (TV series), a renovation company based reality TV show

== Political parties ==
- Khmer Renovation, a former royalist political party of Cambodia
- Spanish Renovation (Spanish: Renovación Española, RE), a defunct political party of Spain
- National Renovation (Chile) (Spanish: Renovación Nacional, RN), a Chilean political party
- Democratic Renovation (French: Rénovation Démocratique), a Mauritanian political party
- Civic Renovation Party (Spanish: Partido Cívico Renovador, PCR), a Dominican Republic political party

== See also ==
- Renovate Now (French: Rénover maintenant), a political block of France in the Socialist Party
- Remodeling (disambiguation)
