= Model School =

Model School may refer to:

== School type ==
- Laboratory school, a type of elementary or secondary school used for teacher training

== Individual schools ==
=== Australia ===
- There were four model schools in Adelaide, South Australia in the late 19th and early 20th-centuries:
  - Currie Street Model School
  - Flinders Street Model School
  - Grote Street Model School
  - Sturt Street Model School

=== United States ===
- American Indian Model Schools, a charter school system in Oakland, California
- Model Laboratory School, a demonstration school in Richmond, Kentucky
- Model Secondary School for the Deaf, a part of Gallaudet University campus, Washington, D.C.
- Riverview Hall, a historic laboratory school in St. Cloud, Minnesota, listed on the National Register of Historic Places as the Model School

=== Other countries ===
- Sohagpur SK Pilot Model High School, Sirajganj, Bangladesh
- Model Higher Secondary School, TT Nagar, Bhopal, India
- Model Technical Higher Secondary Schools, a set of secondary schools in Kerala, India
- Government Model Boys Higher Secondary School, Thiruvananthapuram, India
- Staats Model School, Pretoria, South Africa

== See also ==
- Model High School (disambiguation)
- Mallikoulu, a 2005 Finnish television series (Model School in English)
- National Association of University-Model Schools
