= Las modelos =

Las modelos (Spanish for "the models") may refer to:

- Las modelos (film), a 1963 Argentine film directed by Vlasta Lah
- Las modelos (telenovela), a 1963 Mexican telenovela produced by Teleprogramas Acapulco, SA

== See also ==
- Modelo (disambiguation), including La Modelo
