= Vim Motor Truck Company =

Defunct American motor vehicle manufacturer

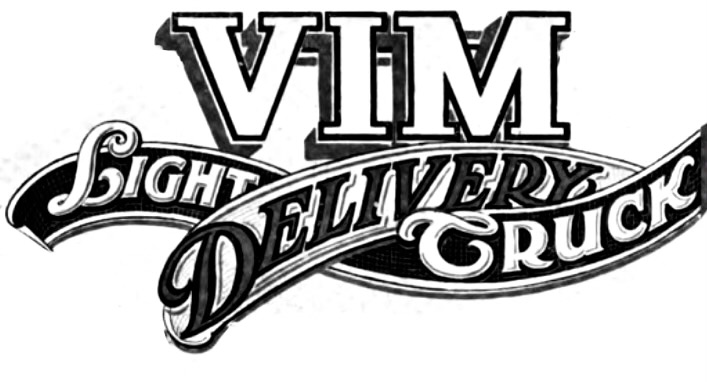
- Formerly: Nance Motor Car Company
- Type: Truck Company
- Industry: Manufacturing
- Founded: 1912; 114 years ago
- Founder: Harold B. Larzelere
- Defunct: 1924; 102 years ago
- Headquarters: Philadelphia, US
- Products: Trucks, Cars

The Vim Motor Truck Company of Philadelphia, was a truck and car manufacturer.

== History ==
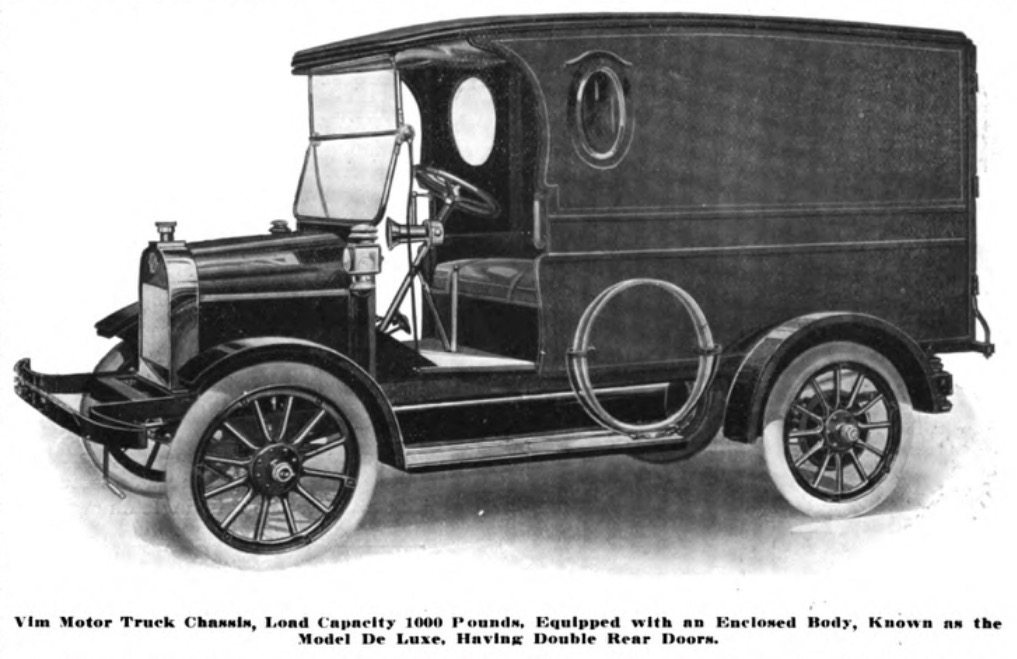
Vim Truck 0,5 to (1916)

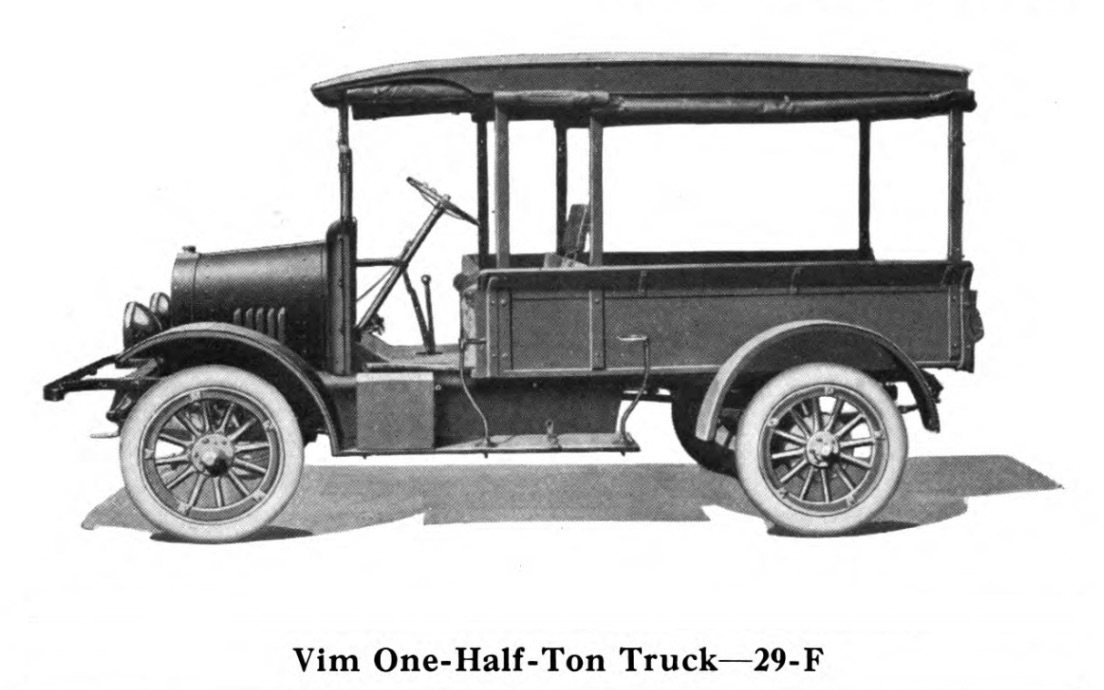
Vim Model 29-F

The company was founded in 1912 in Philadelphia, Pennsylvania. The investor was Touraine. In the same year, they started making passenger cars. In 1913, they added commercial vehicles, which were marketed as Vim. The brand name for the passenger cars was Touraine. The predecessor company was the Nance Motor Car Company. Harold B. Larzelere ran both companies. In 1914, there was a small car that apparently remained just a prototype. In 1915, the company was renamed Vim Motor Truck Company. Passenger car production stopped in 1916, but trucks continued to be made until 1924. In 1916, a lot of money was invested in expanding the factory with the goal of producing around 30,000 trucks per year. The engines were either in-house developments or came from the company Hercules. In the summer of 1921, the Standard Steel Car Company from Pittsburgh took over Vim. According to the Branham automobile reference book from 1927, vehicles could also have been produced in 1925.
