= Model Automobile Company =

Defunct American motor vehicle manufacturer

Model Gas Engine Company Model Automobile Company
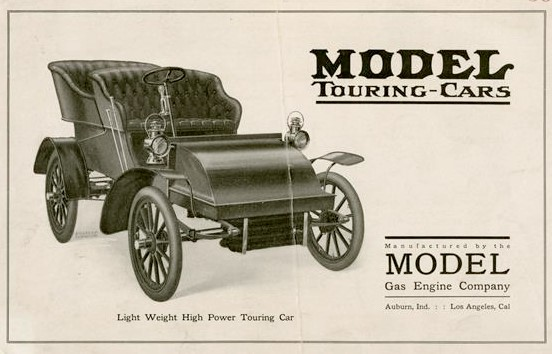
- 1904 Model 16hp Touring Car
- Predecessor: Model Gas Engine Company
- Founded: 1902; 124 years ago
- Founder: Edward A. Myers
- Defunct: 1909; 117 years ago
- Fate: Merged
- Successor: Great Western Automobile Company
- Headquarters: Peru, Indiana, United States
- Key people: E. A. Myers
- Products: Automobiles
- Production output: 825 (1902-1909)
- Brands: Model, Star

The Model Automobile Company was a brass era American automobile manufacturer located in Peru, Indiana from 1902 to 1909.

== History ==
Edward A. Myers established the Model Gas and Gas Engine Company in 1901 in Auburn, Indiana. Manufacturing gasoline engines, in 1902 Model added a 2-cylinder 12-hp automobile to its products. This was joined by a 16-hp version in 1904, but a financial crisis in Auburn forced Myers to reorganize his company.

=== Model ===
By 1906 Myers had sold over 300 automobiles and reorganized into two companies, one dedicated to automobile production. The Model Gas Engine Works and Model Automobile Company relocated to Peru, Indiana in 1906. The 1905 Model 2-cylinder engine had been increased to 20-hp. Model automobiles had convertible coachwork which allowed the body to be tilted upward from the rear for access to the engine, and permitting the rear seats to be removed as a unit. In 1906 Model prices ranged from $900 for a runabout to $1,250 (equivalent to $44,792 in 2025) for a touring car.

In 1907 Model introduced a 4-cylinder automobile. This was a 45-hp touring car, with the engine moved under the hood and priced at $2,000, equivalent to $69,107 in 2025.

=== Star ===
Model's main business was selling engines and transmissions to other automobile, truck and tractor manufacturers and decided it would seem less of a conflict to sell completed automobiles under a different marque. For 1908 and 1909 Model Automobile Company products were known as Star. The Star was continued as 2-cylinder or 4-cylinder cars, with the 4-cylinder models increased to 50-hp.

In 1909 E. A. Myers decided to spin off the automobile manufacturing completely and organized the Great Western Automobile Company and all cars from 1910 to 1916 would be Great Westerns.

In 1911 Myers would work with a Dr. H. H. Bissell of Watseka, Illinois who commissioned a car Bisell called the Izzer. The first example pleased Myers so much, that two more examples were produced. Myers retained one of the cars and gave the second to the Model office manager, James Littlejohn. Bissell's Izzer is still extant.

Model Gas Engine Works was sold to Pittsburgh investors in 1912 and the factory and E. A .Myers moved to Pittsburgh. In 1914 he returned to Peru to run Great Western. In 1916 Standard Steel Car Company purchased the Model Gas Engine Company factory and assets to expand Standard automobile production.

== Gallery ==
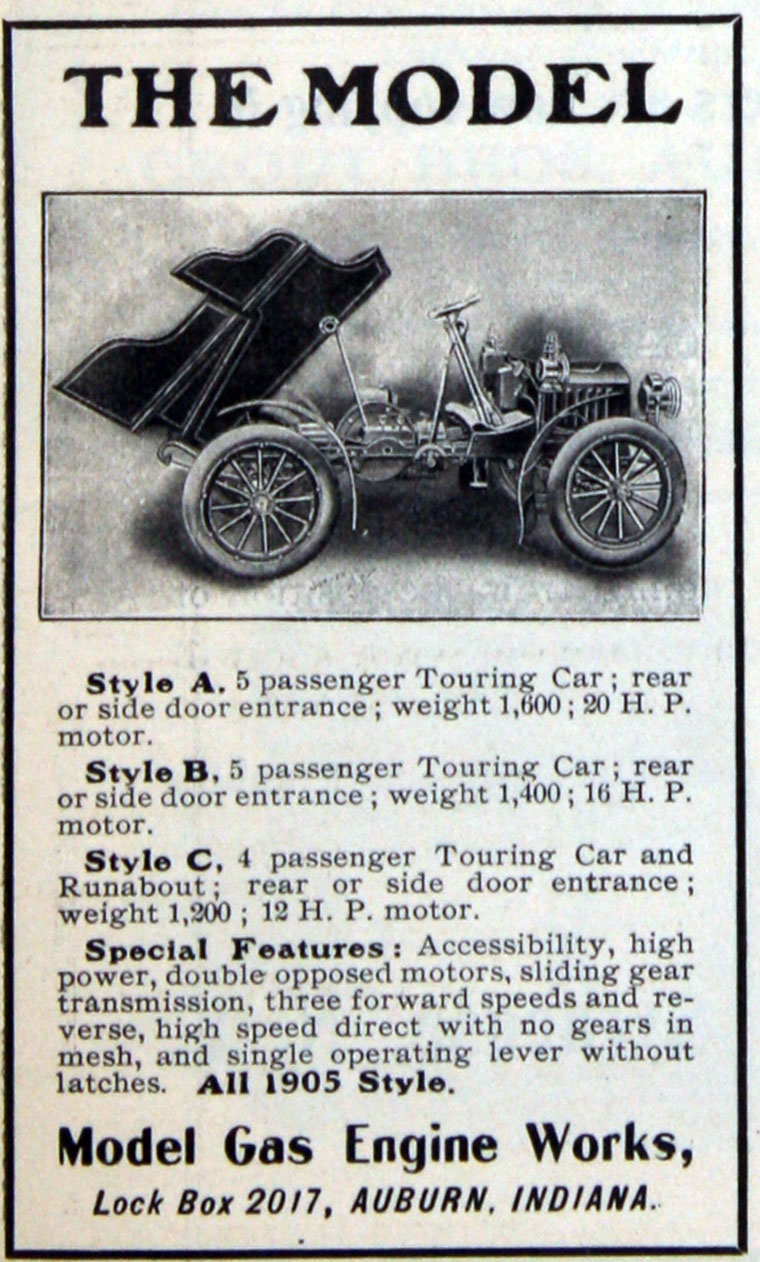
1905 Model - three styles advertisement

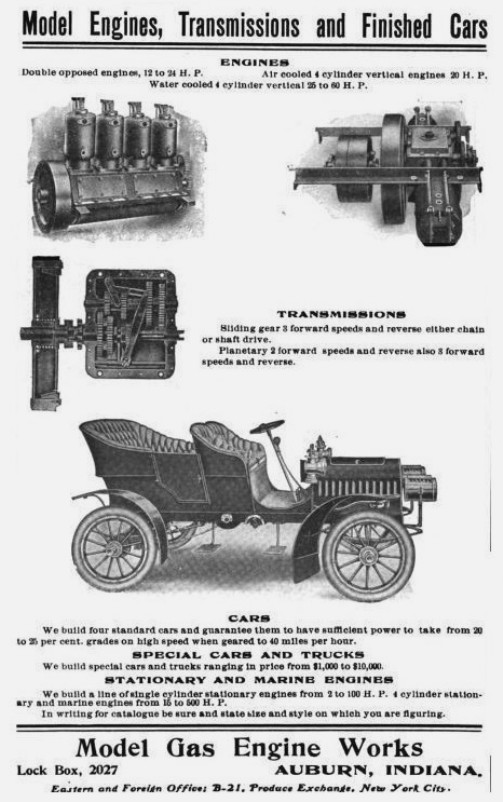
1906 Model finished cars advertisement

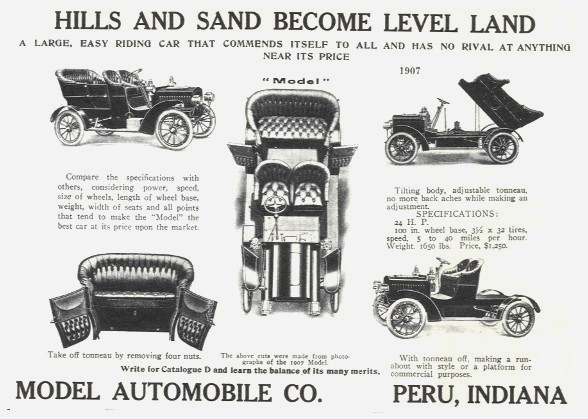
1907 Model Automobile Co. advertisement
