= Models (album) =

Studio album by Lee Gamble
- Released: 20 October 2023
- Genre: Electronic
- Length: 32:04
- Label: Hyperdub

Lee Gamble chronology
Mnestic Pressure (2017)	Models (2023)

Models is the second studio album by British electronic musician and producer Lee Gamble. It was released on 20 October by Hyperdub Records.

== Background ==
On 25 July 2023, Lee Gamble announced the release of his studio album, along with the first single "She's Not".

== Critical reception ==
Professional ratings
Aggregate scores
Source	Rating
Metacritic	75/100
Review scores
Source	Rating
AllMusic	3.5/5 stars
Pitchfork	7.3/10
PopMatters	7/10

Models was met with "generally favorable" reviews from critics. At Metacritic, which assigns a weighted average rating out of 100 to reviews from mainstream publications, this release received an average score of 75, based on 4 reviews.

Writing for Pitchfork, Daniel Bromfield said "Models is a cold, sad, wispy album whose songs are like ghosts trying to communicate their unfinished business, unable to puncture the barrier between their plane of existence and ours. The seven tracks on the UK producer's new album don't just deconstruct pop music; they obliterate it".

== Track listing ==
Models track listing
No.	Title	Length
1.	"Purple, Orange"	2:28
2.	"Juice"	3:54
3.	"Xith C Spray"	5:27
4.	"She's Not"	3:45
5.	"Phantom Limb"	5:03
6.	"Blurring"	4:52
7.	"Your Weight on My Arms"	6:35
Total length:		32:04
