= Mercado Modelo =

Mercado Modelo (Spanish and Portuguese for "Model Market") may refer to:

- Mercado Modelo (Montevideo), a former market hall in Montevideo, Uruguay
- Mercado Modelo (Salvador), Brazil
