= Model (surname) =

Model is a surname. Notable people with the surname include:

- Abram Model (1896–1976), Russian chess master
- Alice Model (1856–1943), leader of the Union of Jewish Women
- Ben Model (born 1962), American collector, publisher, and presenter of silent films
- Lisette Model (1901–1983), Austrian-born American photographer
- Walter Model (1891–1945), German field marshal of World War II
