= Bernadette Modell =

British geneticist

Professor Bernadette Modell FRCP FRCOG
- Born: 1 August 1935 (age 91); London
- Education: University of Oxford; Cambridge University
- Occupation: Geneticist
- Employers: University College London; University College London Hospitals
- Website: iris.ucl.ac.uk/iris/browse/profile?upi=BCMOD56

Bernadette Modell (born 1 August 1935 in London) is a British geneticist, specialising in the study of thalassaemia.

Modell attended a convent school, and then graduated in zoology, with genetics and embryology from the University of Oxford, in 1955. She then undertook a doctorate in developmental biology at Cambridge University, qualifying in 1959. She next studied medicine at Cambridge and at University College Hospital, qualifying in 1964.

She spent the remainder of her career at University College London and at University College London Hospitals, mainly working on the treatment and prevention of thalassaemia major and retiring in 2000, after which she became Emeritus Professor of Community Genetics at UCL's Centre for Health Informatics and Multiprofessional Education.

She also served as Director of the World Health Organization's Collaborating Centre for Community Control of Hereditary Disorders.

She is both a Fellow of the Royal College of Physicians (FRCP) and a Fellow of the Royal College of Obstetricians and Gynaecologists (FRCOG).

== Selected papers ==
- Modell B, Khan M, Darlison M (2000). "Survival in β-thalassaemia major in the UK: data from the UK Thalassaemia Register." Lancet;355(9220): 2051–2. doi:10.1016/S0140-6736(00)02357-6
- Modell B, Darlison M (2008). "Global epidemiology of haemoglobin disorders and derived service indicators." Bulletin of the World Health Organization;86:480–7. doi:10.2471/BLT.06.036673
- Modell B, Darlison MW, Lawn JE (2018). "Historical overview of development in methods to estimate burden of disease due to congenital disorders." Journal of Community Genetics;9(4):341–5. doi:10.1007/s12687-018-0382-4
