= Model High School (disambiguation) =

Model High School may refer to:

- Model High School, in Georgia in the United States
- Kanchannagar Model High School, Jhenaidah in Bangladesh
- Robin Model High School, in Punjab state, India
- Nanyang Model High School in Nanyang, China
- Madison-Model High School in Richmond, Kentucky in the United States, a partnership between two separate high schools in that city that ended in the early 1960s
- The high school component of Model Laboratory School, one of the two schools that formed Madison–Model
- Chittagong Municipal Model High School in Bangladesh
- Hira Model High School Mandani in Khyber Pakhtunkhwa, Pakistan
- Motijheel Model High School and College, in Dhaka, Bangladesh
