= Model Town, Kolkata =

Model Town
- Neighbourhood
- Location in Kolkata Model Town (West Bengal)
- Coordinates: 22°27′45″N 88°23′45″E
- Country: India
- State: West Bengal
- District: South 24 Parganas
- Region: Greater Kolkata
- Metro Station: Shahid Khudiram
- Lok Sabha constituency: Jadavpur
- Vidhan Sabha constituency: Sonarpur Uttar
- Municipality: Rajpur Sonarpur Municipality
- Time zone: UTC+5:30 (IST)
- PIN: 700 084
- Area code: +91 33

Model Town is a small neighbourhood on the southern part of the E.M. Bypass at Balia in Garia, close to Kolkata, India. It is a posh locality with several housing complexes. The locality is near to Garia railway station of Kolkata Suburban Railway. The premium residential complex 4 Sight Model Town is in this area.

== See also ==
- New Garia
