= Model Town =

A model town is a town built to a high standard and intended as a model for others to imitate. The term was first used in 1909.

Model Town may specifically refer to:

- Model Town (Delhi), a subdivision of North Delhi, Delhi, India
  - Model Town Assembly constituency
  - Model Town metro station, Delhi
- Model Town Humak, a suburb of Islamabad, Pakistan
- Model Town, Kolkata, neighbourhood of Kolkata in South 24 Parganas, West Bengal, India
- Model Town, Lahore is a suburb of Lahore, Punjab, Pakistan
- Model Town metro station, Surat Metro, Gujarat, India

== See also ==
- Model village
