= Remodeling (disambiguation) =

Remodeling is the process of improving a building.

Remodeling may also refer to:

- Actin remodeling, a biochemical process in cells
- Bone remodeling, the process whereby old bone is removed from the skeleton and new bone is added
- Chromatin remodeling, the enzyme-assisted movement of nucleosomes on DNA
- Microvasculature remodeling, the alterations in a blood vessel network resulting from arteriogenesis and angiogenesis
- Tissue remodeling, the reorganization or renovation of existing tissues.
- Ventricular remodeling, the changes in size, shape, and function of the heart after injury to the ventricles

== See also ==
- Model (disambiguation)
