= Standard Steel Car Company =

Rolling stock manufacturer

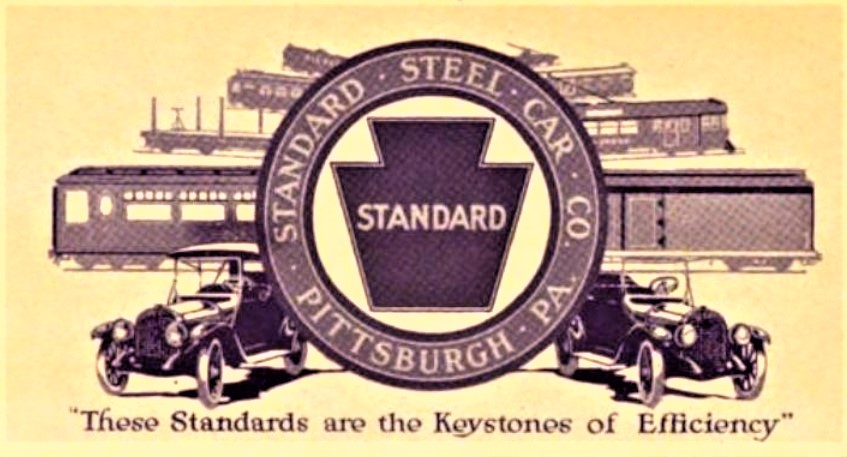
- Company logo from 1915

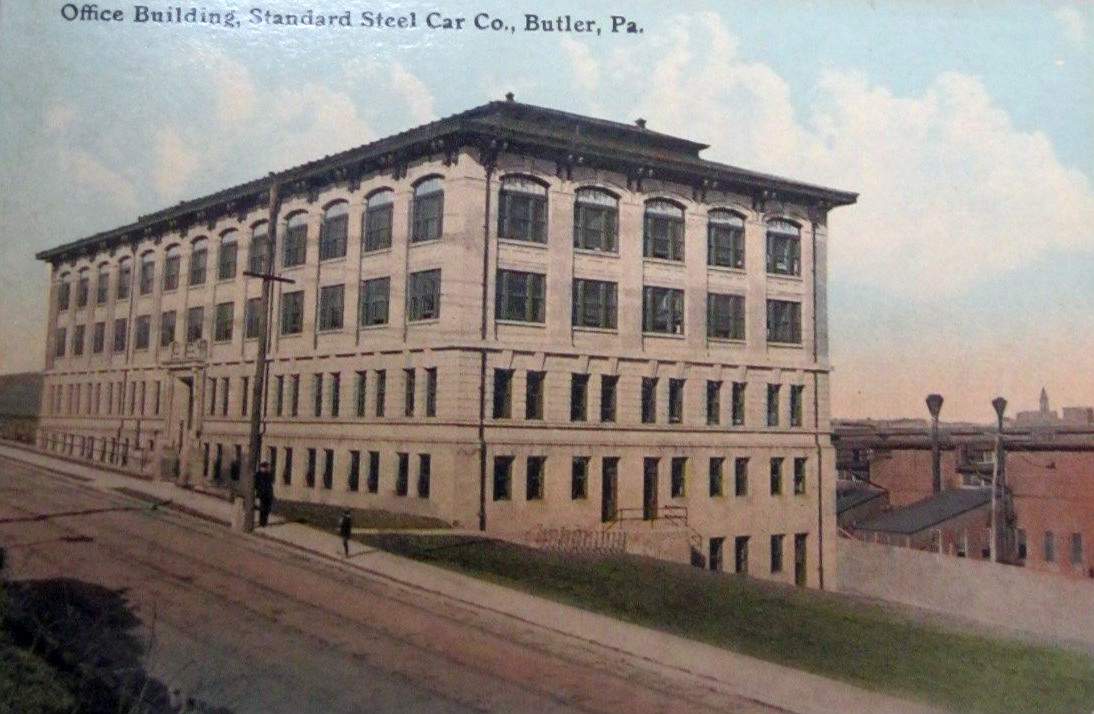
- Standard Steel Office Building in Butler, PA
- Industry: Railroad
- Founded: 1902; 124 years ago
- Founder: John M. Hansen, "Diamond Jim" Brady
- Defunct: 1934; 92 years ago
- Fate: Merger
- Successor: Pullman-Standard
- Headquarters: Butler, Pennsylvania, United States
- Products: Rolling stock

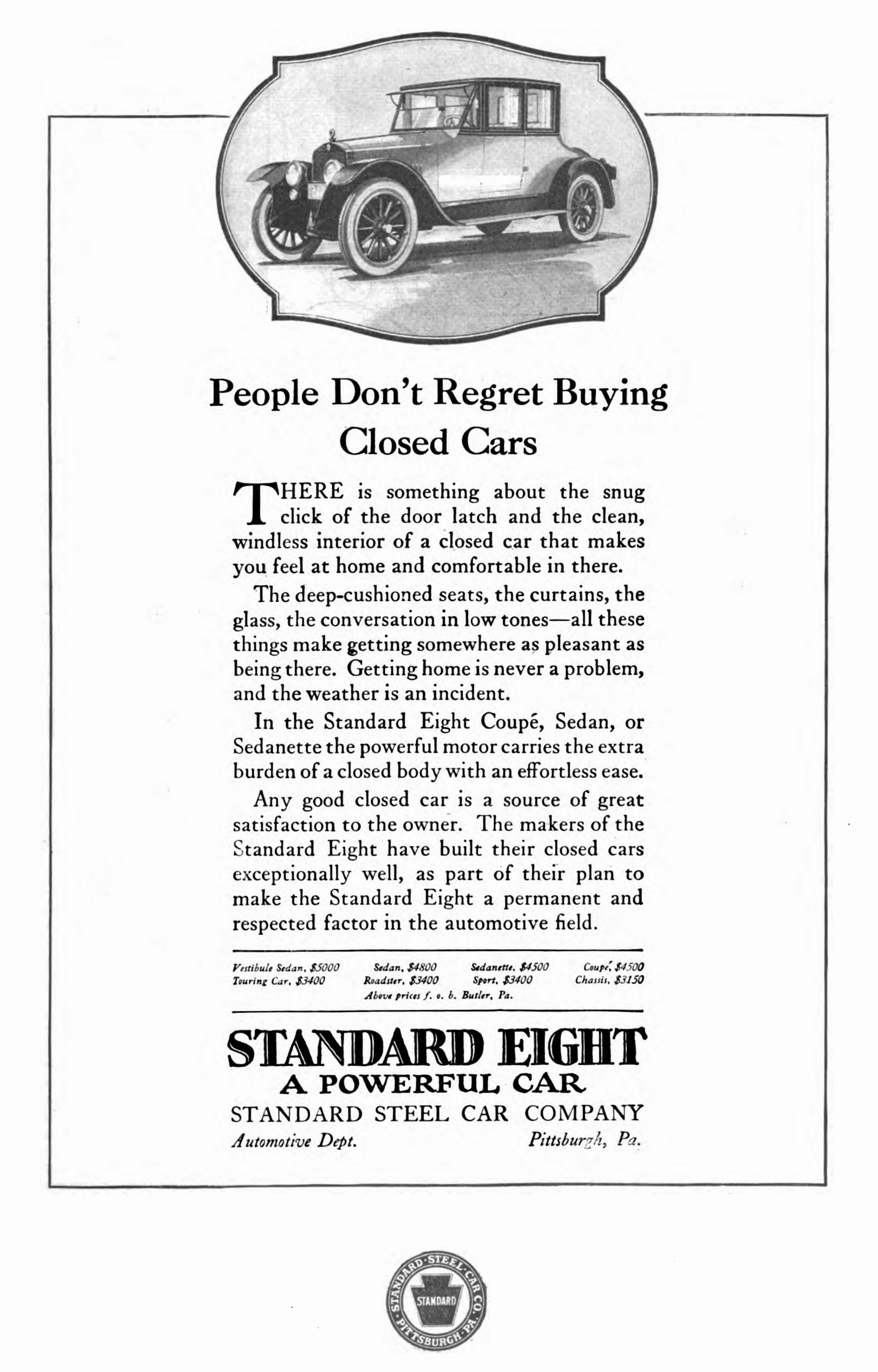
1921 advertisement

The Standard Steel Car Company (SSC) was a manufacturer of railroad rolling stock in the United States that existed between 1902 and 1934.

Established in 1902 in Butler, Pennsylvania by John M. Hansen and "Diamond Jim" Brady, the company quickly became one of the largest builders of steel cars in the United States. Pullman, Inc. purchased control of SSC in 1929 and merged it with Pullman Car & Manufacturing in 1934 to form Pullman-Standard Car Manufacturing Company.

== History ==
The overnight success of the Pressed Steel Car Company at the end of the 19th century spurred a flurry of competitors in the suddenly booming market for steel railroad cars. American Car & Foundry predecessor Michigan-Peninsular Car had produced steel frame cars beginning in 1897, American Steel Foundries produced steel cars in 1900, and the Cambria Steel Company opened a car plant at Johnstown, Pennsylvania in 1901. Pressed Steel Car's Chief Designer John M. Hansen and famed salesman "Diamond Jim" Brady left the company in 1901 to found SSC. With financial backing from Andrew Mellon, SSC was incorporated on January 2, 1902, broke ground for its new half-mile long plant in Butler in April, and produced its first car (Chesapeake & Ohio 23001) in August.

Hansen's carbuilding philosophy was the opposite of Pressed Steel Car founder Charles T. Schoen's. Schoen believed that each part of a car should be cut and shaped (pressed) from sheet steel to minimize weight and the need for assemblies of small parts while maximizing strength. The custom stamping dies and assemblies needed for this work were expensive and uneconomical in small quantities. Hansen preferred to use standard steel shapes that were already widely available from the steel mills at economical cost. SSC's earliest production reflected this: a steel hopper with side posts made from standard channel and angle shapes became the company's signature product, building over 7,500 through 1907.

Expansion was immediate. Capacity was increased first to 60 cars a day, then 125 cars a day in 1903. Production peaked at 29,411 cars in 1907, 2,836 of those built in January of that year. In October of 1907, a ladle full of 9,000 lbs. of molten steel, exploded, killing 4 workers instantly, fatally wounding 20 others, and severely injuring 10 more. SSC would bounce back from this disaster. SSC's subsidiary, Standard Car Truck Company, opened at New Castle, Pennsylvania in 1906, and a second SSC plant opened at Hammond, Indiana in 1907. Hansen established a car shop in LaRochelle, France for SSC in 1917, and SSC also controlled a plant in Rio de Janeiro, Brazil. SSC also entered the field of automobile production in 1913 with the Standard Eight, which in 1919 had 83 horsepower (62 kW). Automobile production ended in 1921.

"Diamond Jim" Brady died in 1917, and Hansen retired from the presidency in 1923, succeeded by Colonel James Frank Drake. Hansen stayed on as board chairman until his death in December 1929. That same month, Pullman Inc. agreed to purchase SSC for 610,000 shares of Pullman stock (worth approximately $51 million) and $6 million in cash. SSC continued to operate independently for several years as the Great Depression brought business to an almost standstill. Merger with Pullman Car & Manufacturing in 1934 created Pullman-Standard, a second giant car builder to rival American Car & Foundry. Pullman continued to operate at Butler until it exited the railroad car business in 1982, and sold the plant to Trinity Industries in 1984. Trinity Industries left the plant in 1993, and in 2005 the plant had been completely demolished. In 2011, a jumbo grain car built by Pullman-Standard in June 1974, was restored and brought to Pullman Square, to serve as a monument to the workers of Standard Steel Car Company and Pullman-Standard.

== Acquisitions ==
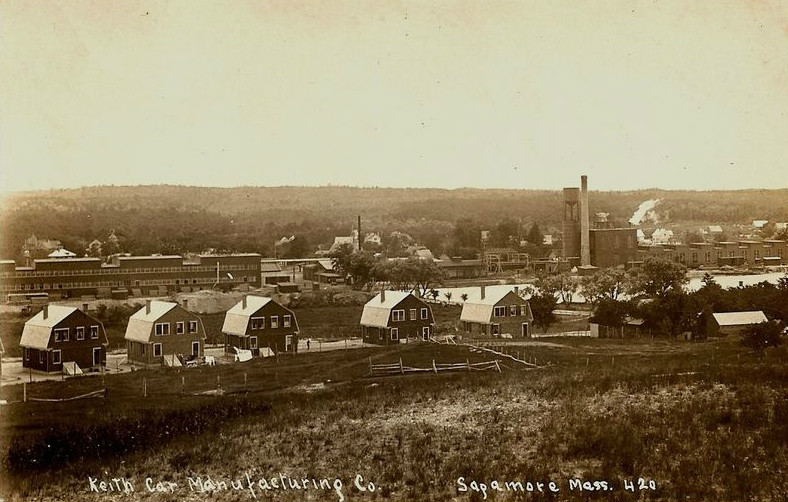
Keith Car Company.

SSC gained control of a number of other car builders during its existence.

- Middletown Car Works (Middletown, Pennsylvania) by 1909
- South Baltimore Car & Foundry (Baltimore, Maryland) by 1910
- Keith Car & Manufacturing Company (Sagamore, Massachusetts) by 1912
- Osgood Bradley Car Company (Worcester, Massachusetts) by 1913
- Vim Motor Truck Company by 1921
- Illinois Car & Manufacturing (Chicago Heights and Hammond, Indiana) by 1928
- Richmond Car Works (Richmond, Virginia) by 1928
- Siems-Stembel Company (St. Paul, Minnesota) by 1928
- Canton Car Company (Canton, Ohio) by 1934

== See also ==
- List of rolling stock manufacturers
