= Renovate Now =

Caucus in the French Socialist Party

Renovate Now (French: Rénover maintenant) is an organized caucus in the French Socialist Party.

The faction was founded in 2005, when Arnaud Montebourg (a member of the NPS faction) refused to support the motion de synthèse at the Le Mans Congress which marked the rallying of most of the NPS (Henri Emmanuelli, Vincent Peillon and Benoît Hamon) to the majority motion led by François Hollande.

Montebourg supported eventual PS candidate Ségolène Royal during the Socialist presidential primaries in 2006, held before the 2007 French presidential election. However, Montebourg supported the motion led by eventual winner Martine Aubry at the Reims Congress in 2008.
